= Koichiro Harada =

Japanese mathematician

Koichiro Harada (原田 耕一郎, Harada Kōichirō) is a Japanese mathematician working on finite group theory.

== Early life and education ==
Harada first came to the United States in 1968, as a student visitor to the Institute for Advanced Study. He received his PhD from the University of Tokyo in 1972.

== Career ==
Rutgers University was the scene from 1969 to 1973 of his collaboration with Daniel Gorenstein on the classification challenge in finite groups. In 1971 he first taught at Ohio State University, and in 1973 he was a visitor at Cambridge University where the Harada-Norton group was discovered.

The Gorenstein–Harada theorem classifies finite simple groups of sectional 2-rank at most 4.

In 1996 Ohio State held a Special Research Quarter on the Monster group and Lie algebras with Proceedings edited by Joseph Ferrar and Harada.

In 2000 Mathematical Society of Japan awarded Harada the Algebra Prize.

After the classification of finite simple groups was announced, Harada proposed the following challenges to group theorists:

1. Find natural mathematical objects realizing all simple groups as their automorphism groups.
2. Prove that there are only finitely many sporadic simple groups.
3. Find the reason why the 26 sporadic simple groups exist.
4. Find a generalization of the Glauberman Z* theorem.
5. Find an arithmetic to give the Schur multipliers of finite simple groups.
6. Complete the theory of modular representations.
7. Classify the 2-groups that can be the Sylow 2-subgroups of finite simple groups.
8. Look for a completely new proof of the classification.
9. Classify finite simple groups having a strongly p-embedded subgroup.
10. Solve problems around the restricted Burnside problem.

== Publications ==
- 1974: (with Daniel Gorenstein) Finite simple groups whose 2-subgroups are generated by at least 4 elements, Memoirs of the American Mathematical Society.
- 1975: On the simple group F of order 2^{14} · 3^{6} · 5^{6} · 7 · 11 · 19. Proc. Group Theory Conference in Park City, Utah, pp. 119–276.
- 1989: Some elliptic curves arising from the Leech lattice, Journal of Algebra 125: 289–310.
- 1999: Monster. Iwanami Publishing, (in Japanese; book on the Monster group).
- 2010: "Moonshine" of Finite Groups, European Mathematical Society ISBN 978-3-03719-090-6 MR2722318
