= Thin group (finite group theory) =

In the mathematical classification of finite simple groups, a thin group is a finite group such that for every odd prime number p, the Sylow p-subgroups of the 2-local subgroups are cyclic. Informally, these are the groups that resemble rank 1 groups of Lie type over a finite field of characteristic 2.

Janko (1972) defined thin groups and classified those of characteristic 2 type in which all 2-local subgroups are solvable. The thin simple groups were classified by Aschbacher (1976, 1978). The list of finite simple thin groups consists of:

- The projective special linear groups PSL_{2}(q)
- The projective special linear groups PSL_{3}(p) for p = 1 + 2^{a} or p = 1 + 2^{a}3, and PSL_{3}(4)
- The projective special unitary groups PSU_{3}(p) for p = 1 - 2^{a} or p = 1 - 2^{a}3, and PSU_{3}(2^{n})
- The Suzuki groups Sz(2^{n})
- The Tits group ^{2}F_{4}(2)'
- The Steinberg group ^{3}D_{4}(2)
- The Mathieu group M_{11}
- The Janko group J1

== See also ==
- Quasithin group
