= Michio Suzuki (mathematician) =

Japanese mathematician

- Born: October 2, 1926; Chiba, Japan
- Died: May 31, 1998 (aged 71); Mitaka, Japan
- Education: University of Tokyo
- Known for: Suzuki groups
- Scientific career
- Fields: Mathematics
- Workplaces: University of Illinois at Urbana–Champaign
- Doctoral advisor: Shokichi Iyanaga
- Doctoral students: Anne Street; Tuval Foguel

Michio Suzuki (鈴木 通夫, Suzuki Michio; October 2, 1926 – May 31, 1998) was a Japanese mathematician who studied group theory.

== Biography ==
He was a professor at the University of Illinois at Urbana–Champaign from 1953 to his death. He also had visiting positions at the University of Chicago (1960–61), the Institute for Advanced Study (1962–63, 1968–69, spring 1981), the University of Tokyo (spring 1971), and the University of Padua (1994). Suzuki received his Ph.D. in 1952 from the University of Tokyo, despite having moved to the United States the previous year. He was the first to attack the Burnside conjecture, that every finite non-abelian simple group has even order.

A notable achievement was his discovery in 1960 of the Suzuki groups, an infinite family of the only non-abelian simple groups whose order is not divisible by 3. The smallest, of order 29120, was the first simple group of order less than 1 million to be discovered since Dickson's list of 1900.

He classified several classes of simple groups of small rank, including the CIT-groups and C-groups and CA-groups.

There is also a sporadic simple group called the Suzuki group, which he announced in 1968. The Tits ovoid is also referred to as the Suzuki ovoid.

He wrote several textbooks in Japanese.

== See also ==
- Baer–Suzuki theorem
- Bender–Suzuki theorem
- Brauer–Suzuki theorem
- Brauer–Suzuki–Wall theorem

== Publications ==
- Brauer, R.; Suzuki, M. (1959). "On finite groups of even order whose 2-Sylow group is a quaternion group". Proc. Natl. Acad. Sci. USA. 45 (12): 1757–1759. Bibcode:1959PNAS...45.1757B. doi:10.1073/pnas.45.12.1757. PMC 222795. PMID 16590569.
- Suzuki, M. (1960). "A new type of simple groups of finite order". Proc. Natl. Acad. Sci. USA. 46 (6): 868–870. Bibcode:1960PNAS...46..868S. doi:10.1073/pnas.46.6.868. PMC 222949. PMID 16590684.
- Suzuki, M. (1960). "Investigations on finite groups". Proc. Natl. Acad. Sci. USA. 46 (12): 1611–1614. Bibcode:1960PNAS...46.1611S. doi:10.1073/pnas.46.12.1611. PMC 223091. PMID 16590792.
- Suzuki, Michio (1969), "A simple group of order 448,345,497,600", in Brauer, R.; Sah, Chih-han (eds.), Theory of Finite Groups (Symposium, Harvard Univ., Cambridge, Mass., 1968), Benjamin, New York, pp. 113–119, MR 0241527
- Suzuki, Michio (1982) [1977], Group theory. I, Grundlehren der Mathematischen Wissenschaften [Fundamental Principles of Mathematical Sciences], vol. 247, Berlin, New York: Springer-Verlag, ISBN 978-3-540-10915-0, MR 0648772
- Suzuki, Michio (1986) [1978], Group theory. II, Grundlehren der Mathematischen Wissenschaften [Fundamental Principles of Mathematical Sciences], vol. 248, Berlin, New York: Springer-Verlag, ISBN 978-0-387-10916-9, MR 0501682
