= Quasithin group =

Algebraic structure

In mathematics, a quasithin group is a finite simple group that resembles a group of Lie type of rank at most 2 over a field of characteristic 2. The classification of quasithin groups is a crucial part of the classification of finite simple groups.

More precisely it is a finite simple group of characteristic 2 type and width 2. Here characteristic 2 type means that its centralizers of involutions resemble those of groups of Lie type over fields of characteristic 2, and the width is roughly the maximal rank of an abelian group of odd order normalizing a non-trivial 2-subgroup of G. When G is a group of Lie type of characteristic 2 type, the width is usually the rank (the dimension of a maximal torus of the algebraic group).

== Classification ==
The quasithin groups were classified in a 1221-page paper by Michael Aschbacher and Stephen D. Smith (2004, 2004b). An earlier announcement by Geoffrey Mason (1980) of the classification, on the basis of which the classification of finite simple groups was announced as finished in 1983, was premature as the unpublished manuscript (Mason 1981) of his work was incomplete and contained serious gaps.

According to Aschbacher & Smith (2004b, theorem 0.1.1), the finite simple quasithin groups of even characteristic are given by

- Groups of Lie type of characteristic 2 and rank 1 or 2, except that U_{5}(q) only occurs for q = 4
- PSL_{4}(2), PSL_{5}(2), Sp_{6}(2)
- The alternating groups on 5, 6, 8, 9 points
- PSL_{2}(p) for p a Fermat or Mersenne prime, L^{ε}_{3}(3), L^{ε}_{4}(3), G_{2}(3)
- The Mathieu groups M_{11}, M_{12}, M_{22}, M_{23}, M_{24}, The Janko groups J_{2}, J_{3}, J_{4}, the Higman–Sims group, the Held group, and the Rudvalis group.

If the condition "even characteristic" is relaxed to "even type" in the sense of the revision of the classification by Daniel Gorenstein, Richard Lyons, and Ronald Solomon, then the only extra group that appears is the Janko group J1.
