= CA-group =

In mathematics, in the realm of group theory, a group is said to be a CA-group or centralizer abelian group if the centralizer of any non-identity element is an abelian subgroup. Finite CA-groups are of historical importance as an early example of the type of classifications that would be used in the Feit–Thompson theorem and the classification of finite simple groups. Several important infinite groups are CA-groups, such as free groups, Tarski monsters, and some Burnside groups, and the locally finite CA-groups have been classified explicitly. CA-groups are also called commutative-transitive groups (or CT-groups for short) because commutativity is a transitive relation amongst the non-identity elements of a group if and only if the group is a CA-group.

== History ==
Locally finite CA-groups were classified by several mathematicians from 1925 to 1998. First, finite CA-groups were shown to be simple or solvable in (Weisner 1925). Then in the Brauer–Suzuki–Wall theorem (Brauer, Suzuki & Wall 1958), finite CA-groups of even order were shown to be Frobenius groups, abelian groups, or 2-dimensional projective special linear groups over a finite field of even order, PSL(2, 2^{f}) for f ≥ 2. Finally, finite CA-groups of odd order were shown to be Frobenius groups or abelian groups in (Suzuki 1957), and so in particular, are never nonabelian simple.

CA-groups were important in the context of the classification of finite simple groups. Michio Suzuki showed that every finite, simple, nonabelian CA-group is of even order. This result was first extended to the Feit–Hall–Thompson theorem showing that finite, simple, nonabelian CN-groups had even order, and then to the Feit–Thompson theorem which states that every finite, simple, nonabelian group is of even order. A textbook exposition of the classification of finite CA-groups is given as example 1 and 2 in (Suzuki 1986, pp. 291–305). A more detailed description of the Frobenius groups appearing is included in (Wu 1998), where it is shown that a finite, solvable CA-group is a semidirect product of an abelian group and a fixed-point-free automorphism, and that conversely every such semidirect product is a finite, solvable CA-group. Wu also extended the classification of Suzuki et al. to locally finite groups.

== Examples ==
Every abelian group is a CA-group, and a group with a non-trivial center is a CA-group if and only if it is abelian. The finite CA-groups are classified: the solvable ones are semidirect products of abelian groups by cyclic groups such that every non-trivial element acts fixed-point-freely and include groups such as the dihedral groups of order 4k+2, and the alternating group on 4 points of order 12, while the nonsolvable ones are all simple and are the 2-dimensional projective special linear groups PSL(2, 2^{n}) for n ≥ 2. Infinite CA-groups include free groups, PSL(2, R), and Burnside groups of large prime exponent, (Lyndon & Schupp 2001, p. 10). Some more recent results in the infinite case are included in (Wu 1998), including a classification of locally finite CA-groups. Wu also observes that Tarski monsters are obvious examples of infinite simple CA-groups.
