= Balance theorem =

In mathematical group theory, the balance theorem states that if G is a group with no core, then G either has disconnected Sylow 2-subgroups, or it is of characteristic 2 type, or it is of component type (Gorenstein 1983, p. 7).

The significance of this theorem is that it splits the classification of finite simple groups into three major subcases.
