= Gorenstein–Harada theorem =

In mathematics, specifically finite group theory, the Gorenstein–Harada theorem, proved by Daniel Gorenstein and Koichiro Harada, classifies the finite simple groups of sectional 2-rank at most 4. It is part of the classification of finite simple groups.

Finite simple groups of section 2 with rank at least 5 have Sylow 2-subgroups with a self-centralizing normal subgroup of rank at least 3, which implies that they have to be of either component type or of characteristic 2 type. Therefore, the Gorenstein–Harada theorem splits the problem of classifying finite simple groups into these two sub-cases.
