= Thompson group =

In mathematics, the term Thompson group or Thompson's group can refer to either

- The finite Thompson sporadic group Th studied by John G. Thompson
- The finite Thompson subgroup of a p-group, the subgroup generated by the abelian subgroups of maximal order.
- "Thompson subgroup" can also mean an analogue of the Weyl group used in the classical involution theorem
- The infinite Thompson groups F, T and V studied by the logician Richard Thompson.

Outside of mathematics, it may also refer to

- Thompson Group Inc.
