= Gorenstein–Walter theorem =

In algebra, the Gorenstein–Walter theorem, proved by Gorenstein and Walter, states that if a finite group G has a dihedral Sylow 2-subgroup, and O(G) is the maximal normal subgroup of odd order, then G/O(G) is isomorphic to a 2-group, or the alternating group A_{7}, or a subgroup of PΓL_{2}(q) containing PSL_{2}(q) for q an odd prime power. Note that A_{5} ≈ PSL_{2}(4) ≈ PSL_{2}(5) and A_{6} ≈ PSL_{2}(9).
