= Classical involution theorem =

Mathematical finite group theory

In mathematical finite group theory, the classical involution theorem of Aschbacher (1977a, 1977b, 1980) classifies simple groups with a classical involution and satisfying some other conditions, showing that they are mostly groups of Lie type over a field of odd characteristic. Berkman (2001) extended the classical involution theorem to groups of finite Morley rank.

A classical involution t of a finite group G is an involution whose centralizer has a subnormal subgroup containing t with quaternion Sylow 2-subgroups.
