= Walter theorem =

In mathematics, the Walter theorem, proved by John H. Walter (1967, 1969), describes the finite groups whose Sylow 2-subgroup is abelian. Bender (1970) used Bender's method to give a simpler proof.

== Statement ==
Walter's theorem states that if G is a finite group whose 2-Sylow subgroups are abelian, then G/O(G) has a normal subgroup of odd index that is a product of groups each of which is a 2-group or one of the simple groups PSL_{2}(q) for q = 2^{n} or q = 3 or 5 mod 8, or the Janko group J1, or Ree groups ^{2}G_{2}(3^{2n+1}). (Here O(G) denotes the unique largest normal subgroup of G of odd order.)

The original statement of Walter's theorem did not quite identify the Ree groups, but only stated that the corresponding groups have a similar subgroup structure as Ree groups. Thompson (1967, 1972, 1977) and Bombieri, Odlyzko & Hunt (1980) later showed that they are all Ree groups, and Enguehard (1986) gave a unified exposition of this result.
