= Coherent set of characters =

In mathematical representation theory, coherence is a property of sets of characters that allows one to extend an isometry from the degree-zero subspace of a space of characters to the whole space. The general notion of coherence was developed by Feit (1960, 1962), as a generalization of the proof by Frobenius of the existence of a Frobenius kernel of a Frobenius group and of the work of Brauer and Suzuki on exceptional characters. Feit & Thompson (1963, Chapter 3) developed coherence further in the proof of the Feit–Thompson theorem that all groups of odd order are solvable.

== Definition ==
Suppose that H is a subgroup of a finite group G, and S a set of irreducible characters of H. Write I(S) for the set of integral linear combinations of S, and I_{0}(S) for the subset of degree 0 elements of I(S). Suppose that τ is an isometry from I_{0}(S) to the degree 0 virtual characters of G. Then τ is called coherent if it can be extended to an isometry from I(S) to characters of G and I_{0}(S) is non-zero. Although strictly speaking coherence is really a property of the isometry τ, it is common to say that the set S is coherent instead of saying that τ is coherent.

== Feit's theorem ==
Feit proved several theorems giving conditions under which a set of characters is coherent. A typical one is as follows. Suppose that H is a subgroup of a group G with normalizer N, such that N is a Frobenius group with kernel H, and let S be the irreducible characters of N that do not have H in their kernel. Suppose that τ is a linear isometry from I_{0}(S) into the degree 0 characters of G. Then τ is coherent unless

- either H is an elementary abelian group and N/H acts simply transitively on its non-identity elements (in which case I_{0}(S) is zero)
- or H is a non-abelian p-group for some prime p whose abelianization has order at most 4|N/H|^{2}+1.

=== Examples ===
If G is the simple group SL_{2}(F_{2^{n}}) for n>1 and H is a Sylow 2-subgroup, with τ induction, then coherence fails for the first reason: H is elementary abelian and N/H has order 2^{n}–1 and acts simply transitively on it.

If G is the simple Suzuki group of order (2^{n}–1) 2^{2n}( 2^{2n}+1) with n odd and n>1 and H is the Sylow 2-subgroup and τ is induction, then coherence fails for the second reason. The abelianization of H has order 2^{n}, while the group N/H has order 2^{n}–1.

== Examples ==
In the proof of the Frobenius theory about the existence of a kernel of a Frobenius group G where the subgroup H is the subgroup fixing a point and S is the set of all irreducible characters of H, the isometry τ on I_{0}(S) is just induction, although its extension to I(S) is not induction.

Similarly in the theory of exceptional characters the isometry τ is again induction.

In more complicated cases the isometry τ is no longer induction. For example, in the Feit–Thompson theorem the isometry τ is the Dade isometry.
