= Fitting subgroup =

In mathematics, especially in the area of algebra known as group theory, the Fitting subgroup F of a finite group G, named after Hans Fitting, is the unique largest normal nilpotent subgroup of G. Intuitively, it represents the smallest subgroup which "controls" the structure of G when G is solvable. When G is not solvable, a similar role is played by the generalized Fitting subgroup F^{*}, which is generated by the Fitting subgroup and the components of G.

For an arbitrary (not necessarily finite) group G, the Fitting subgroup is defined to be the subgroup generated by the nilpotent normal subgroups of G. For infinite groups, the Fitting subgroup is not always nilpotent.

The remainder of this article deals exclusively with finite groups.

== The Fitting subgroup ==
The nilpotency of the Fitting subgroup of a finite group is guaranteed by Fitting's theorem which says that the product of a finite collection of normal nilpotent subgroups of G is again a normal nilpotent subgroup. It may also be explicitly constructed as the product of the p-cores of G over all of the primes p dividing the order of G.

If G is a finite non-trivial solvable group then the Fitting subgroup is always non-trivial, i.e. if G≠1 is finite solvable, then F(G)≠1. Similarly the Fitting subgroup of G/F(G) will be nontrivial if G is not itself nilpotent, giving rise to the concept of Fitting length. Since the Fitting subgroup of a finite solvable group contains its own centralizer, this gives a method of understanding finite solvable groups as extensions of nilpotent groups by faithful automorphism groups of nilpotent groups.

In a nilpotent group, every chief factor is centralized by every element. Relaxing the condition somewhat, and taking the subgroup of elements of a general finite group which centralize every chief factor, one simply gets the Fitting subgroup again (Huppert 1967, Kap.VI, Satz 5.4, p.686):

$$\operatorname{Fit}(G) = \bigcap \{ C_G(H/K) : H/K \text{ a chief factor of } G \}.$$

The generalization to p-nilpotent groups is similar.

== The generalized Fitting subgroup ==
A component of a group is a subnormal quasisimple subgroup. (A group is quasisimple if it is a perfect central extension of a simple group.) The layer E(G) or L(G) of a group is the subgroup generated by all components. Any two components of a group commute, so the layer is a perfect central extension of a product of simple groups, and is the largest normal subgroup of G with this structure. The generalized Fitting subgroup F^{*}(G) is the subgroup generated by the layer and the Fitting subgroup. The layer commutes with the Fitting subgroup, so the generalized Fitting subgroup is a central extension of a product of p-groups and simple groups.

The layer is also the maximal normal semisimple subgroup, where a group is called semisimple if it is a perfect central extension of a product of simple groups.

This definition of the generalized Fitting subgroup can be motivated by some of its intended uses. Consider the problem of trying to identify a normal subgroup H of G that contains its own centralizer and the Fitting group. If C is the centralizer of H we want to prove that C is contained in H. If not, pick a minimal characteristic subgroup M/Z(H) of C/Z(H), where Z(H) is the center of H, which is the same as the intersection of C and H. Then M/Z(H) is a product of simple or cyclic groups as it is characteristically simple. If M/Z(H) is a product of cyclic groups then M must be in the Fitting subgroup. If M/Z(H) is a product of non-abelian simple groups then the derived subgroup of M is a normal semisimple subgroup mapping onto M/Z(H). So if H contains the Fitting subgroup and all normal semisimple subgroups, then M/Z(H) must be trivial, so H contains its own centralizer. The generalized Fitting subgroup is the smallest subgroup that contains the Fitting subgroup and all normal semisimple subgroups.

The generalized Fitting subgroup can also be viewed as a generalized centralizer of chief factors. A nonabelian semisimple group cannot centralize itself, but it does act on itself as inner automorphisms. A group is said to be quasi-nilpotent if every element acts as an inner automorphism on every chief factor. The generalized Fitting subgroup is the unique largest subnormal quasi-nilpotent subgroup, and is equal to the set of all elements which act as inner automorphisms on every chief factor of the whole group (Huppert & Blackburn 1982, Chapter X, Theorem 5.4, p. 126):

$$\operatorname{Fit}^*(G) = \bigcap\{ HC_G(H/K) : H/K \text{ a chief factor of } G \}.$$

Here an element g is in HC_{G}(H/K) if and only if there is some h in H such that for every x in H, x^{g} ≡ x^{h} mod K.

== Properties ==
If G is a finite solvable group, then the Fitting subgroup contains its own centralizer. The centralizer of the Fitting subgroup is the center of the Fitting subgroup. In this case, the generalized Fitting subgroup is equal to the Fitting subgroup. More generally, if G is a finite group, then the generalized Fitting subgroup contains its own centralizer. This means that in some sense the generalized Fitting subgroup controls G, because G modulo the centralizer of F^{*}(G) is contained in the automorphism group of F^{*}(G), and the centralizer of F^{*}(G) is contained in F^{*}(G). In particular there are only a finite number of groups with given generalized Fitting subgroup.

== Applications ==
The normalizers of nontrivial p-subgroups of a finite group are called the p-local subgroups and exert a great deal of control over the structure of the group (allowing what is called local analysis). A finite group is said to be of characteristic p type if F^{*}(G) is a p-group for every p-local subgroup, because any group of Lie type defined over a field of characteristic p has this property. In the classification of finite simple groups, this allows one to guess over which field a simple group should be defined. Note that a few groups are of characteristic p type for more than one p.

If a simple group is not of Lie type over a field of given characteristic p, then the p-local subgroups usually have components in the generalized Fitting subgroup, though there are many exceptions for groups that have small rank, are defined over small fields, or are sporadic. This is used to classify the finite simple groups, because if a p-local subgroup has a known component, it is often possible to identify the whole group (Aschbacher & Seitz 1976).

The analysis of finite simple groups by means of the structure and embedding of the generalized Fitting subgroups of their maximal subgroups was originated by Helmut Bender (Bender 1970) and has come to be known as Bender's method. It is especially effective in the exceptional cases where components or signalizer functors are not applicable.
