= Ida May Schottenfels =

American mathematician

- Born: December 21, 1869
- Died: March 11, 1942 (aged 72)
- Scientific career
- Institutions: University of Toledo

Ida May Schottenfels (December 21, 1869 – March 11, 1942) was an American mathematician and university professor.

== Education and career ==
She was a student at the University of Chicago, earning a master's degree in mathematics in 1896. After working as a schoolteacher, she joined the New York Normal College as an instructor in 1901, and by 1913, she headed the mathematics department at Adrian College in Michigan. She was cited as one of the most "active" women mathematicians of the time. From 1891 to 1906 she gave 17 lectures at meetings of the American Mathematical Society and published three papers. She presented her paper "On a set of generators for certain substitution and Galois field groups" at the 1904 AMS meeting.

== Research ==
In group theory, Schottenfels was the first mathematician to prove that there exist two non-isomorphic simple groups of the same order, by demonstrating that there are two non-isomorphic simple groups of order 20,160.
