= Ronald Solomon =

American mathematician

Ronald "Ron" Mark Solomon (b. 15 December 1948) is an American mathematician specializing in the theory of finite groups.

Solomon studied as an undergraduate at Queens College and received a PhD in 1971 at Yale University under Walter Feit with the thesis Finite Groups with Sylow 2-Subgroups of the Type of the Alternating Group on Twelve Letters. In 1972, he began his participation in the classification program for finite simple groups, after hearing a lecture by Daniel Gorenstein. He was for two years an instructor at the University of Chicago and the academic year 1974–1975 at Rutgers University, before he became a professor at Ohio State University, where he has remained. In 2006, he received the Levi L. Conant Prize and in 2012 the Leroy P. Steele Prize. In 2012, he was elected a Fellow of the American Mathematical Society.

With Daniel Gorenstein and Richard Lyons he wrote, and is continuing to write now with Inna Capdeboscq, a series on the second-generation proof of the classification program for finite simple groups. Ten volumes of this series have been published so far.

== Works ==
- with Daniel Gorenstein, Richard Lyons: The classification of the finite simple groups, American Mathematical Society, 9 Volumes, 1994–2021
- Solomon "A brief history of the classification of finite simple groups", Bull. of the AMS, Vol.38, No. 3, 2001, pdf file (paper that won the Conant Prize for 2006)
- Abstract algebra, Belmont/California, Thompson Brooks/Cole 2003
