= B-theorem =

Theorem in group theory

In mathematics, the B-theorem is a result in finite group theory formerly known as the B-conjecture.

The theorem states that if $C$ is the centralizer of an involution of a finite group, then every component of $C/O(C)$ is the image of a component of $C$.
