= Feit–Thompson theorem =

Classification theorem in group theory

In mathematics, the Feit–Thompson theorem, or odd order theorem, states that every finite group of odd order is solvable. It was proved in the early 1960s by Walter Feit and John Griggs Thompson.

== History ==
The contrast that these results show between groups of odd and even order suggests inevitably that simple groups of odd order do not exist.

— William Burnside (1911, p. 503 note M)

In the early 20th century, William Burnside conjectured that every nonabelian finite simple group has even order. Richard Brauer suggested using the centralizers of involutions of simple groups as the basis for the classification of finite simple groups, as the Brauer–Fowler theorem shows that there are only a finite number of finite simple groups with given centralizer of an involution. A group of odd order has no involutions, so to carry out Brauer's program it is first necessary to show that non-cyclic finite simple groups never have odd order. This is equivalent to showing that odd order groups are solvable, which is what Feit and Thompson proved.

The attack on Burnside's conjecture was started by Michio Suzuki, who studied CA groups; these are groups such that the centralizer of every non-trivial element is abelian. In a pioneering paper he showed that all CA groups of odd order are solvable. (He later classified all the simple CA groups, and more generally all simple groups such that the centralizer of any involution has a normal 2-Sylow subgroup, finding an overlooked family of simple groups of Lie type in the process, that are now called Suzuki groups.)

Feit, Thompson, and Marshall Hall extended Suzuki's work to the family of CN groups; these are groups such that the centralizer of every non-trivial element is nilpotent. They showed that every CN group of odd order is solvable. Their proof is similar to Suzuki's proof. It was about 17 pages long, which at the time was thought to be very long for a proof in group theory.

The Feit–Thompson theorem can be thought of as the next step in this process: they show that there is no non-cyclic simple group of odd order such that every proper subgroup is solvable. This proves that every finite group of odd order is solvable, as a minimal counterexample must be a simple group such that every proper subgroup is solvable. Although the proof follows the same general outline as the CA theorem and the CN theorem, the details are vastly more complicated. The final paper is 255 pages long and filled the entirety of Volume 13, Issue 3 of the Pacific Journal of Mathematics.

== Significance of the proof ==
The Feit–Thompson theorem showed that the classification of finite simple groups using centralizers of involutions might be possible, as every nonabelian simple group has an involution. Many of the techniques they introduced in their proof, especially the idea of local analysis, were developed further into tools used in the classification. Perhaps the most revolutionary aspect of the proof was its length: before the Feit–Thompson paper, few arguments in group theory were more than a few pages long and most could be read in a day. Once group theorists realized that such long arguments could work, a series of papers that were several hundred pages long started to appear. Some of these dwarfed even the Feit–Thompson paper; the paper by Michael Aschbacher and Stephen D. Smith on quasithin groups was 1,221 pages long.

== Revision of the proof ==
Many mathematicians have simplified parts of the original Feit–Thompson proof. However all of these improvements are in some sense local; the global structure of the argument is still the same, but some of the details of the arguments have been simplified.

The simplified proof has been published in two books: Bender & Glauberman (1994) covers everything except the character theory, and Peterfalvi (2000) covers the character theory. This revised proof is still very hard, and is longer than the original proof, but is written in a more leisurely style.

A fully formal proof, checked with the Rocq proof assistant, was announced in September 2012 by Georges Gonthier and fellow researchers at Microsoft Research and Inria.

== An outline of the proof ==
Instead of describing the Feit–Thompson theorem directly, it is easier to describe Suzuki's CA theorem and then comment on some of the extensions needed for the CN-theorem and the odd order theorem. The proof can be broken up into three steps. We let G be a non-abelian (minimal) simple group of odd order satisfying the CA condition.

=== Step 1. Local analysis of the structure of the group G ===
This is easy in the CA case because the relation "a commutes with b" is an equivalence relation on the non-identity elements. So the elements break up into equivalence classes, such that each equivalence class is the set of non-identity elements of a maximal abelian subgroup. The normalizers of these maximal abelian subgroups turn out to be exactly the maximal proper subgroups of G. These normalizers are Frobenius groups whose character theory is reasonably transparent, and well-suited to manipulations involving character induction. Also, the set of prime divisors of |G| is partitioned according to the primes which divide the orders of the distinct conjugacy classes of maximal abelian subgroups of |G|. This pattern of partitioning the prime divisors of |G| according to conjugacy classes of certain Hall subgroups (a Hall subgroup is one whose order and index are relatively prime) which correspond to the maximal subgroups of G (up to conjugacy) is repeated in both the proof of the Feit–Hall–Thompson CN-theorem and in the proof of the Feit–Thompson odd-order theorem.

Each maximal subgroup M has a certain nilpotent Hall subgroup M_{σ} with normalizer contained in M, whose order is divisible by certain primes forming a set σ(M). Two maximal subgroups are conjugate if and only if the sets σ(M) are the same, and if they are not conjugate then the sets σ(M) are disjoint. Every prime dividing the order of G occurs in some set σ(M). So the primes dividing the order of G are partitioned into equivalence classes corresponding to the conjugacy classes of maximal subgroups.

The proof of the CN-case is already considerably more difficult than the CA-case: the main extra problem is to prove that two different Sylow subgroups intersect in the identity. This part of the proof of the odd-order theorem takes over 100 journal pages. A key step is the proof of the Thompson uniqueness theorem, stating that abelian subgroups of normal rank at least 3 are contained in a unique maximal subgroup, which means that the primes p for which the Sylow p-subgroups have normal rank at most 2 need to be considered separately. Bender later simplified the proof of the uniqueness theorem using Bender's method. Whereas in the CN-case, the resulting maximal subgroups M are still Frobenius groups, the maximal subgroups that occur in the proof of the odd-order theorem need no longer have this structure, and the analysis of their structure and interplay produces 5 possible types of maximal subgroups, called types I, II, III, IV, V.

Type I subgroups are of "Frobenius type", a slight generalization of Frobenius group, and in fact later on in the proof are shown to be Frobenius groups. They have the structure M_{F}⋊U where M_{F} is the largest normal nilpotent Hall subgroup, and U has a subgroup U_{0} with the same exponent such that M_{F}⋊U_{0} is a Frobenius group with kernel M_{F}. Types II, III, IV, V are all 3-step groups with structure M_{F}⋊U⋊W_{1}, where M_{F}⋊U is the derived subgroup of M. The subdivision into types II, III, IV and V depends on the structure and embedding of the subgroup U as follows:

- Type II: U is nontrivial abelian and its normalizer is not contained in M.
- Type III: U is nontrivial abelian and its normalizer is contained in M.
- Type IV: U is nonabelian.
- Type V: U is trivial.

All but two classes of maximal subgroups are of type I, but there may also be two extra classes of maximal subgroups, one of type II, and one of type II, III, IV, or V.

=== Step 2. Character theory of G ===
If X is an irreducible character of the normalizer H of the maximal abelian subgroup A of the CA group G, not containing A in its kernel, we can induce X to a character Y of G, which is not necessarily irreducible. Because of the known structure of G, it is easy to find the character values of Y on all but the identity element of G. This implies that if X_{1} and X_{2} are two such irreducible characters of H and Y_{1} and Y_{2} are the corresponding induced characters, then Y_{1} − Y_{2} is completely determined, and calculating its norm shows that it is the difference of two irreducible characters of G (these are sometimes known as exceptional characters of G with respect to H). A counting argument shows that each non-trivial irreducible character of G arises exactly once as an exceptional character associated to the normalizer of some maximal abelian subgroup of G.

A similar argument (but replacing abelian Hall subgroups by nilpotent Hall subgroups) works in the proof of the CN-theorem. However, in the proof of the odd-order theorem, the arguments for constructing characters of G from characters of subgroups are far more delicate, and use the Dade isometry between character rings rather than character induction, since the maximal subgroups have a more complicated structure and are embedded in a less transparent way. The theory of exceptional characters is replaced by the theory of a coherent set of characters to extend the Dade isometry. Roughly speaking, this theory says that the Dade isometry can be extended unless the groups involved have a certain precise structure.

=== Step 3. The final contradiction ===
By step 2, we have a complete and precise description of the character table of the CA group G. From this, and using the fact that G has odd order, sufficient information is available to obtain estimates for |G| and arrive at a contradiction to the assumption that G is simple. This part of the argument works similarly in the CN-group case.

In the proof of the Feit–Thompson theorem, however, this step is (as usual) vastly more complicated. The character theory only eliminates some of the possible configurations left after step 1. First they show that the maximal subgroups of type I are all Frobenius groups. If all maximal subgroups are type I then an argument similar to the CN case shows that the group G cannot be an odd-order minimal simple group, so there are exactly two classes of maximal subgroups of types II, III, IV or V. Most of the rest of the proof now focuses on these two types of maximal subgroup S and T and the relation between them. More character-theoretic arguments show that they cannot be of types IV or V. The two subgroups have a precise structure: the subgroup S is of order p^{q}×q×(p^{q}–1)/(p–1) and consists of all automorphisms of the underlying set of the finite field of order p^{q} of the form x→ax^{σ}+b where a has norm 1 and σ is an automorphism of the finite field, where p and q are distinct primes. The maximal subgroup T has a similar structure with p and q reversed. The subgroups S and T are closely linked. Taking p>q, one can show that the cyclic subgroup of S of order (p^{q}–1)/(p–1) is conjugate to a subgroup of the cyclic subgroup of T of order (q^{p}–1)/(q–1). (In particular, the first number divides the second, so if the Feit–Thompson conjecture is true, it would assert that this cannot happen, and this could be used to finish the proof at this point. The conjecture is still unproven, however.)

The conclusion from applying character theory to the group G is that G has the following structure: there are primes p>q such that (p^{q}–1)/(p–1) is coprime to p–1 and G has a subgroup given by the semidirect product PU where P is the additive group of a finite field of order p^{q} and U its elements of norm 1. Moreover G has an abelian subgroup Q of order prime to p containing an element y such that P_{0} normalizes Q and (P_{0})^{y} normalizes U, where P_{0} is the additive group of the finite field of order p. (For p=2 a similar configuration occurs in the group SL_{2}(2^{q}), with PU a Borel subgroup of upper triangular matrices and Q the subgroup of order 3 generated by $\scriptstyle y=\left(\begin{smallmatrix}0 & 1 \\ 1 & 1\end{smallmatrix}\right)$.) To eliminate this final case, Thompson used some fearsomely complicated manipulations with generators and relations, which were later simplified by Peterfalvi (1984) The proof examines the set of elements a in the finite field of order p^{q} such that a and 2–a both have norm 1. One first checks that this set has at least one element other than 1. Then a rather difficult argument using generators and relations in the group G shows that the set is closed under taking inverses. If a is in the set and not equal to 1 then the polynomial N((1–a)x+1)–1 has degree q and has at least p distinct roots given by the elements x in F_{p}, using the fact that x→1/(2–x) maps the set to itself, so p≤q, contradicting the assumption p>q.

== Use of oddness ==
The fact that the order of the group G is odd is used in several places in the proof, as follows (Thompson 1963).

- The Hall–Higman theorem is sharper for groups of odd order.
- For groups of odd order, all non-principal characters occur in complex conjugate pairs.
- Several results about p-groups only hold for odd primes p.
- If a group of odd order has no elementary abelian subgroups of rank 3, then its derived group is nilpotent. (This fails for the symmetric group S_{4} of even order.)
- Several arguments involving character theory fail for small primes, especially for the prime 2.
