= Signalizer functor =

In mathematics, in the area of abstract algebra, a signalizer functor is a mapping from a potential finite subgroup to the centralizers of the nontrivial elements of an abelian group. The signalizer functor theorem provides the conditions under which the source of such a functor is in fact a subgroup.

The signalizer functor was first defined by Daniel Gorenstein. George Glauberman proved the Solvable Signalizer Functor Theorem for solvable groups and Patrick McBride proved it for general groups. Results concerning signalizer functors play a major role in the classification of finite simple groups.

== Definition ==
Let A be a non-cyclic elementary abelian p-subgroup of the finite group G. An A-signalizer functor on G (or simply a signalizer functor when A and G are clear) is a mapping θ from the set of nonidentity elements of A to the set of A-invariant p′-subgroups of G satisfying the following properties:

- For every nonidentity element $a\in A$, the group $\theta(a)$ is contained in $C_G(a).$
- For every pair of nonidentity elements $a, b\in A$, we have $\theta(a) \cap C_G(b) \subseteq \theta(b).$

The second condition above is called the balance condition. If the subgroups $\theta(a)$ are all solvable, then the signalizer functor $\theta$ itself is said to be solvable.

== Solvable signalizer functor theorem ==
Given $\theta,$ certain additional, relatively mild, assumptions allow one to prove that the subgroup $W= \langle \theta(a) \mid a \in A, a \neq 1\rangle$ of $G$ generated by the subgroups $\theta(a)$ is in fact a $p'$-subgroup.

The Solvable Signalizer Functor Theorem proved by Glauberman states that this will be the case if $\theta$ is solvable and $A$ has at least three generators. The theorem also states that under these assumptions, $W$ itself will be solvable.

Several weaker versions of the theorem were proven before Glauberman's proof was published. Gorenstein proved it under the stronger assumption that $A$ had rank at least 5. David Goldschmidt proved it under the assumption that $A$ had rank at least 4 or was a 2-group of rank at least 3. Helmut Bender gave a simple proof for 2-groups using the ZJ theorem, and Paul Flavell gave a proof in a similar spirit for all primes. Glauberman gave the definitive result for solvable signalizer functors. Using the classification of finite simple groups, McBride showed that $W$ is a $p'$-group without the assumption that $\theta$ is solvable.

=== Completeness ===
The terminology of completeness is often used in discussions of signalizer functors. Let $\theta$ be a signalizer functor as above, and consider the set И of all $A$-invariant $p'$-subgroups $H$ of $G$ satisfying the following condition:

- $H\cap C_G(a) \subseteq \theta(a)$ for all nonidentity $a \in A.$

For example, the subgroups $\theta(a)$ belong to И as a result of the balance condition of θ.

The signalizer functor $\theta$ is said to be complete if И has a unique maximal element when ordered by containment. In this case, the unique maximal element can be shown to coincide with $W$ above, and $W$ is called the completion of $\theta$. If $\theta$ is complete, and $W$ turns out to be solvable, then $\theta$ is said to be solvably complete.

Thus, the Solvable Signalizer Functor Theorem can be rephrased by saying that if $A$ has at least three generators, then every solvable $A$-signalizer functor on $G$ is solvably complete.

== Examples of signalizer functors ==
The easiest way to obtain a signalizer functor is to start with an $A$-invariant $p'$-subgroup $M$ of $G,$ and define $\theta(a) = M\cap C_G(a)$ for all nonidentity $a \in A.$ However, it is generally more practical to begin with $\theta$ and use it to construct the $A$-invariant $p'$-group.

The simplest signalizer functor used in practice is $\theta(a) = O_{p'}(C_G(a)).$

As defined above, $\theta(a)$ is indeed an $A$-invariant $p'$-subgroup of $G$, because $A$ is abelian. However, some additional assumptions are needed to show that this $\theta$ satisfies the balance condition. One sufficient criterion is that for each nonidentity $a \in A,$ the group $C_G(a)$ is solvable (or $p$-solvable or even $p$-constrained).

Verifying the balance condition for this $\theta$ under this assumption can be done using Thompson's $P\times Q$-lemma.

== Coprime action ==
To obtain a better understanding of signalizer functors, it is essential to know the following general fact about finite groups:

- Let $E$ be an abelian non-cyclic group acting on the finite group $X.$ Assume that the orders of $E$ and $X$ are relatively prime.
- Then $X = \langle C_X(E_0) \mid E_0 \subseteq E, \text{ and } E/E_0 \text{ cyclic }\rangle$

This fact can be proven using the Schur–Zassenhaus theorem to show that for each prime $q$ dividing the order of $X,$ the group $X$ has an $E$-invariant Sylow $q$-subgroup. This reduces to the case where $X$ is a $q$-group. Then an argument by induction on the order of $X$ reduces the statement further to the case where $X$ is elementary abelian with $E$ acting irreducibly. This forces the group $E/C_E(X)$ to be cyclic, and the result follows.

This fact is used in both the proof and applications of the Solvable Signalizer Functor Theorem.

For example, one useful result is that it implies that if $\theta$ is complete, then its completion is the group $W$ defined above.

=== Normal completion ===
Another result that follows from the fact above is that the completion of a signalizer functor is often normal in $G$:

Let $\theta$ be a complete $A$-signalizer functor on $G$.

Let $B$ be a noncyclic subgroup of $A.$ Then the coprime action fact together with the balance condition imply that$W= \langle \theta(a) \mid a \in A, a \neq 1\rangle = \langle \theta(b) \mid b \in B, b \neq 1\rangle.$

To see this, observe that because $\theta(a)$ is B-invariant, $\theta(a) = \langle \theta(a) \cap C_G(b) \mid b \in B, b \neq 1\rangle \subseteq \langle \theta(b) \mid b \in B, b \neq 1\rangle.$

The equality above uses the coprime action fact, and the containment uses the balance condition. Now, it is often the case that $\theta$ satisfies an "equivariance" condition, namely that for each $g \in G$ and nonidentity $a \in A$, $\theta(a^g) = \theta(a)^g \,$ where the superscript denotes conjugation by $g.$ For example, the mapping $a \mapsto O_{p'}(C_G(a))$, the example of a signalizer functor given above, satisfies this condition.

If $\theta$ satisfies equivariance, then the normalizer of $B$ will normalize $W.$ It follows that if $G$ is generated by the normalizers of the noncyclic subgroups of $A,$ then the completion of $\theta$ (i.e., W) is normal in $G.$
