= Component theorem =

Classification of finite simple groups

In the mathematical classification of finite simple groups, the component theorem of Aschbacher (1975, 1976) shows that if G is a simple group of odd type, and various other assumptions are satisfied, then G has a centralizer of an involution with a "standard component" with small centralizer.
