= Uniqueness case =

In mathematics, specifically finite group theory, the uniqueness case is one of the three possibilities for groups of characteristic 2 type given by the trichotomy theorem.

The uniqueness case covers groups G of characteristic 2 type with e(G) ≥ 3 that have an almost strongly p-embedded maximal 2-local subgroup for all primes p whose 2-local p-rank is sufficiently large (usually at least 3). Aschbacher (1983a, 1983b) proved that there are no finite simple groups in the uniqueness case.
