= Bender's method =

Group theory method by Bender

In group theory, Bender's method is a method introduced by Bender (1970) for simplifying the local group theoretic analysis of the odd order theorem. Shortly afterwards he used it to simplify the Walter theorem on groups with abelian Sylow 2-subgroups Bender (1970b), and Gorenstein and Walter's classification of groups with dihedral Sylow 2-subgroups. Bender's method involves studying a maximal subgroup M containing the centralizer of an involution, and its generalized Fitting subgroup F^{*}(M).

One succinct version of Bender's method is the result that if M, N are two distinct maximal subgroups of a simple group with F^{*}(M) ≤ N and F^{*}(N) ≤ M, then there is a prime p such that both F^{*}(M) and F^{*}(N) are p-groups. This situation occurs whenever M and N are distinct maximal parabolic subgroups of a simple group of Lie type, and in this case p is the characteristic, but this has only been used to help identify groups of low Lie rank. These ideas are described in textbook form in Gagen (1976, p. 43), Huppert & Blackburn (1982, Chapter X. 15), Gorenstein, Lyons & Solomon (1996, p. 110, Chapter F.19), and Kurzweil & Stellmacher (2004, Chapter 10.1).
