= L-balance theorem =

Mathematical theorem

In mathematical finite group theory, the L-balance theorem was proved by Gorenstein & Walter (1975). The letter L stands for the layer of a group, and "balance" refers to the property discussed below.

== Statement ==
The L-balance theorem of Gorenstein and Walter states that if X is a finite group and T a 2-subgroup of X then

$$L_{2'}(C_X(T)) \le L_{2'}(X)$$

Here L_{2′}(X) stands for the 2-layer of a group X, which is the product of all the 2-components of the group, the minimal subnormal subgroups of X mapping onto components of X/O(X).

A consequence is that if a and b are commuting involutions of a group G then

$$L_{2'}(L_{2'}(C_a)\cap C_b) = L_{2'}(L_{2'}(C_b)\cap C_a)$$

This is the property called L-balance.

More generally similar results are true if the prime 2 is replaced by a prime p, and in this case the condition is called L_{p}-balance, but the proof of this requires the classification of finite simple groups (more precisely the Schreier conjecture).
