= Strongly embedded subgroup =

In finite group theory, an area of abstract algebra, a strongly embedded subgroup of a finite group G is a proper subgroup H of even order such that H ∩ H^{g} has odd order whenever g is not in H. The Bender–Suzuki theorem, proved by Bender (1971) extending work of Suzuki (1962, 1964), classifies the groups G with a strongly embedded subgroup H. It states that either

1. G has cyclic or generalized quaternion Sylow 2-subgroups and H contains the centralizer of an involution
2. or G/O(G) has a normal subgroup of odd index isomorphic to one of the simple groups PSL_{2}(q), Sz(q) or PSU_{3}(q) where q≥4 is a power of 2 and H is O(G)N_{G}(S) for some Sylow 2-subgroup S.

Peterfalvi (2000, part II) revised Suzuki's part of the proof.

Aschbacher (1974) extended Bender's classification to groups with a proper 2-generated core.
