= Frobenius group =

Concept in mathematics

In mathematics, a Frobenius group is a transitive permutation group on a finite set, such that no non-trivial element fixes more than one point and some non-trivial element fixes a point. They are named after F. G. Frobenius.

== Structure ==
Suppose G is a Frobenius group consisting of permutations of a set X. A subgroup H of G fixing a point of X is called a Frobenius complement. The identity element together with all elements not in any conjugate of H form a normal subgroup called the Frobenius kernel K. (This is a theorem due to Frobenius (1901); there is still no proof of this theorem that does not use character theory, although see.) The Frobenius group G is the semidirect product of K and H:

$$G=K\rtimes H$$.

Both the Frobenius kernel and the Frobenius complement have very restricted structures. J. G. Thompson (1960) proved that the Frobenius kernel K is a nilpotent group. If H has even order then K is abelian. The Frobenius complement H has the property that every subgroup whose order is the product of 2 primes is cyclic; this implies that its Sylow subgroups are cyclic or generalized quaternion groups. Any group such that all Sylow subgroups are cyclic is called a Z-group, and in particular must be a metacyclic group: this means it is the extension of two cyclic groups. If a Frobenius complement H is not solvable then Zassenhaus showed that it has a normal subgroup of index 1 or 2 that is the product of SL(2,5) and a metacyclic group of order coprime to 30. In particular, if a Frobenius complement coincides with its derived subgroup, then it is isomorphic with SL(2,5). If a Frobenius complement H is solvable then it has a normal metacyclic subgroup such that the quotient is a subgroup of the symmetric group on 4 points. A finite group is a Frobenius complement if and only if it has a faithful, finite-dimensional representation over a finite field in which non-identity group elements correspond to linear transformations without nonzero fixed points.

The Frobenius kernel K is uniquely determined by G as it is the Fitting subgroup, and the Frobenius complement is uniquely determined up to conjugacy by the Schur-Zassenhaus theorem. In particular a finite group G is a Frobenius group in at most one way.

== Examples ==
The Fano plane

- The smallest example is the symmetric group on 3 points, with 6 elements. The Frobenius kernel K has order 3, and the complement H has order 2.
- For every finite field F_{q} with q (> 2) elements, the group of invertible affine transformations $x \mapsto ax+b$, $a\ne 0$ acting naturally on F_{q} is a Frobenius group. The preceding example corresponds to the case F_{3}, the field with three elements.
- Another example is provided by the subgroup of order 21 of the collineation group of the Fano plane generated by a 3-fold symmetry σ fixing a point and a cyclic permutation τ of all 7 points, satisfying στ = τ^{2}σ. Identifying F_{8}^{×} with the Fano plane, σ can be taken to be the restriction of the Frobenius automorphism σ(x) = x^{2} of F_{8} and τ to be multiplication by any element not 0 or 1 (i.e. a generator of the cyclic multiplicative group of F_{8}). This Frobenius group acts simply transitively on the 21 flags in the Fano plane, i.e. lines with marked points.
- The dihedral group of order 2n with n odd is a Frobenius group with complement of order 2. More generally if K is any abelian group of odd order and H has order 2 and acts on K by inversion, then the semidirect product K.H is a Frobenius group.
- Many further examples can be generated by the following constructions. If we replace the Frobenius complement of a Frobenius group by a non-trivial subgroup we get another Frobenius group. If we have two Frobenius groups K_{1}.H and K_{2}.H then (K_{1} × K_{2}).H is also a Frobenius group.
- If K is the non-abelian group of order 7^{3} with exponent 7, and H is the cyclic group of order 3, then there is a Frobenius group G that is an extension K.H of H by K. This gives an example of a Frobenius group with non-abelian kernel. This was the first example of Frobenius group with nonabelian kernel (it was constructed by Otto Schmidt).
- If H is the group SL_{2}(F_{5}) of order 120, it acts fixed point freely on a 2-dimensional vector space K over the field with 11 elements. The extension K.H is the smallest example of a non-solvable Frobenius group.
- The subgroup of a Zassenhaus group fixing a point is a Frobenius group.
- Frobenius groups whose Fitting subgroup has arbitrarily large nilpotency class were constructed by Ito: Let q be a prime power, d a positive integer, and p a prime divisor of q −1 with d ≤ p. Fix some field F of order q and some element z of this field of order p. The Frobenius complement H is the cyclic subgroup generated by the diagonal matrix whose i,i'th entry is z^{i}. The Frobenius kernel K is the Sylow q-subgroup of GL(d,q) consisting of upper triangular matrices with ones on the diagonal. The kernel K has nilpotency class d −1, and the semidirect product KH is a Frobenius group.

== Representation theory ==
The irreducible complex representations of a Frobenius group G can be read off from those of H and K. There are two types of irreducible representations of G:

- Any irreducible representation R of H gives an irreducible representation of G using the quotient map from G to H. These give the irreducible representations of G with K in their kernel.
- If S is any non-trivial irreducible representation of K, then the corresponding induced representation of G is also irreducible. These give the irreducible representations of G with K not in their kernel.

== Alternative definitions ==
There are a number of group theoretical properties which are interesting on their own right, but which happen to be equivalent to the group possessing a permutation representation that makes it a Frobenius group.

- G is a Frobenius group if and only if G has a proper, nonidentity subgroup H such that H ∩ H^{g} is the identity subgroup for every g ∈ G − H, i.e. H is a malnormal subgroup of G.

This definition is then generalized to the study of trivial intersection sets which allowed the results on Frobenius groups used in the classification of CA groups to be extended to the results on CN groups and finally the odd order theorem.

Assuming that $G = K\rtimes H$ is the semidirect product of the normal subgroup K and complement H, then the following restrictions on centralizers are equivalent to G being a Frobenius group with Frobenius complement H:

- The centralizer C_{G}(k) is a subgroup of K for every nonidentity k in K.
- C_{H}(k) = 1 for every nonidentity k in K.
- C_{G}(h) ≤ H for every nonidentity h in H.
