= Gilman–Griess theorem =

In finite group theory, a mathematical discipline, the Gilman–Griess theorem, proved by Robert H. Gilman and Robert L. Griess, classifies the finite simple groups of characteristic 2 type with e(G) ≥ 4 that have a "standard component", which covers one of the three cases of the trichotomy theorem.
