= Harada–Norton group =

Sporadic simple group

In the area of modern algebra known as group theory, the Harada–Norton group HN is a sporadic simple group of order

$$273,030,912,000,000 = 2^{14} \cdot 3^6 \cdot 5^6 \cdot 7\cdot 11\cdot 19 \approx 3 \times 10^{14}.$$

It was discovered by Koichiro Harada and Simon P. Norton.

== History and properties ==
HN has trivial Schur multiplier, and its outer automorphism group has order 2.

It has an involution whose centralizer is of the form 2.HS.2, where HS is the Higman-Sims group (which is how Harada found it).

The prime 5 plays a special role in the group. For example, it centralizes an element of order 5 in the Monster group (which is how Norton found it), and as a result acts naturally on a vertex operator algebra over $\mathbb{F}_5$, the field with 5 elements. This implies that it acts on a 133 dimensional algebra over $\mathbb{F}_5$ with a commutative but nonassociative product, analogous to the Griess algebra.

The full normalizer of a 5A element in the Monster group is (D_{10} × HN).2, so HN centralizes 5 involutions alongside the 5-cycle. These involutions are centralized by the baby monster group, which therefore contains HN as a subgroup.

== Generalized monstrous moonshine ==
Conway and Norton suggested in their 1979 paper that monstrous moonshine is not limited to the monster, but that similar phenomena may be found for other groups. Larissa Queen and others subsequently found that one can construct the expansions of many Hauptmoduln from simple combinations of dimensions of sporadic groups. To recall, the prime number 5 plays a special role in the group and for HN, the relevant McKay-Thompson series is $T_{5A}(\tau)$ where one can set the constant term $a(0)=-6$:

$$\begin{align}
j_{5A}(\tau) = T_{5A}&(\tau)-6 = \left(\frac{\eta(\tau)}{\eta(5\tau)}\right)^{6}+5^3 \left(\frac{\eta(5\tau)}{\eta(\tau)}\right)^6 \\[6pt]
&= \frac{1}{q} - 6 + 134q + 760q^2 + 3345q^3 + 12256q^4 + 39350q^5 + \dots\end{align}$$

(sequence A007251 in the OEIS) and $\eta(\tau)$ is the Dedekind eta function.

== Maximal subgroups ==
Norton and Wilson found the 14 conjugacy classes of maximal subgroups of HN as follows:

Maximal subgroups of HN
No.	Structure	Order	Index	Comments
1	A_{12}	239,500,800 = 2^{9}·3^{5}·5^{2}·7·11	1,140,000 = 2^{5}·3·5^{4}·19	
2	2^{·}HS.2	177,408,000 = 2^{11}·3^{2}·5^{3}·7·11	1,539,000 = 2^{3}·3^{4}·5^{3}·19	centralizer of an involution of class 2A
3	U_{3}(8):3	16,547,328 = 2^{9}·3^{5}·7·19	16,500,000 = 2^{5}·3·5^{6}·11	
4	2^{1+8}.(A_{5} × A_{5}).2	3,686,400 = 2^{14}·3^{2}·5^{2}	74,064,375 = 3^{4}·5^{4}·7·11·19	centralizer of an involution of class 2B
5	(D_{10} × U_{3}(5)).2	2,520,000 = 2^{6}·3^{2}·5^{4}·7	108,345,600 = 2^{8}·3^{4}·5^{2}·11·19	normalizer of a subgroup of order 5 (class 5A)
6	5^{1+4}.2^{1+4}.5.4	2,000,000 = 2^{7}·5^{6}	136,515,456 = 2^{7}·3^{6}·7·11·19	normalizer of a subgroup of order 5 (class 5B)
7	2^{6}.U_{4}(2)	1,658,880 = 2^{12}·3^{4}·5	164,587,500 = 2^{2}·3^{2}·5^{5}·7·11·19	
8	(A_{6} × A_{6}).D_{8}	1,036,800 = 2^{9}·3^{4}·5^{2}	263,340,000 = 2^{5}·3^{2}·5^{4}·7·11·19	
9	2^{3+2+6}.(3 × L_{3}(2))	1,032,192 = 2^{14}·3^{2}·7	264,515,625 = 3^{4}·5^{6}·11·19	
10	5^{2+1+2}.4.A_{5}	750,000 = 2^{4}·3·5^{6}	364,041,216 = 2^{10}·3^{5}·7·11·19	
11,12	M_{12}:2	190,080 = 2^{7}·3^{3}·5·11	1,436,400,000 = 2^{7}·3^{3}·5^{5}·7·19	two classes, fused by an outer automorphism
13	3^{4}:2.(A_{4} × A_{4}).4	93,312 = 2^{7}·3^{6}	2,926,000,000 = 2^{7}·5^{6}·7·11·19	
14	3^{1+4}:4.A_{5}	58,320 = 2^{4}·3^{6}·5	4,681,600,000 = 2^{10}·5^{5}·7·11·19	normalizer of a subgroup of order 3 (class 3B)

- Harada, Koichiro (1976). "On the simple group F of order 2^{14} · 3^{6} · 5^{6} · 7 · 11 · 19". Proceedings of the Conference on Finite Groups (Utah, 1975). New York: Academic Press. pp. 119–276. doi:10.1016/B978-0-12-633650-4.50017-5. ISBN 0-12-633650-4. MR 0401904.
- Lux, Klaus; Noeske, Felix; Ryba, Alexander J. E. (2008). "The 5-modular characters of the sporadic simple Harada–Norton group HN and its automorphism group HN.2". Journal of Algebra. 319 (1): 320–335. doi:10.1016/j.jalgebra.2007.03.046. MR 2378074.
- Norton, S. P. (1975). F and Other Simple Groups (PhD thesis). University of Cambridge.
- Norton, S. P.; Wilson, R. A. (1986). "Maximal subgroups of the Harada-Norton group". Journal of Algebra. 103 (1): 362–376. doi:10.1016/0021-8693(86)90192-4. MR 0860712.
- Ryba, Alexander J. E. (1996). "A natural invariant algebra for the Harada-Norton group". Mathematical Proceedings of the Cambridge Philosophical Society. 119 (4): 597–614. doi:10.1017/S0305004100074454. MR 1362942.
