= Richard Lyons (mathematician) =

American mathematician

Richard Neil Lyons (born January 22, 1945, in New York City, New York) is an American mathematician specializing in finite group theory.

Lyons received his PhD in 1970 at the University of Chicago under John Griggs Thompson with the thesis Characterizations of Some Finite Simple Groups with Small 2-Rank. From 1972 to 2017, he was a professor at Rutgers University.

With Daniel Gorenstein and Ronald Solomon he wrote, and is continuing to write, now with Inna Capdeboscq, a series on the second-generation proof of the classification program for finite simple groups. Ten volumes of this series have been published so far. He discovered a sporadic group which Charles Sims constructed and called the Lyons group Ly.

In 2012, he shared the Leroy P. Steele Prize for Mathematical Exposition, awarded by the American Mathematical Society, with Michael Aschbacher, Stephen D. Smith, and Ronald Solomon. In 2013, he became a fellow of the American Mathematical Society "for contributions to the classification of the finite simple groups, including the discovery of one of the 26 sporadic finite simple groups.".

== Works ==
- with Gorenstein: The local structure of finite groups of characteristic 2 type, American Mathematical Society, 1983
- with Daniel Gorenstein, Ronald Solomon: The classification of the finite simple groups, American Mathematical Society, 10 Vols., 1994–2023
- with Michael Aschbacher, Stephen D. Smith, Ronald Solomon: The classification of finite simple groups: Groups of characteristic 2 type, American Mathematical Society, 2011
