= Trichotomy theorem =

Theorem in group theory

In group theory, the trichotomy theorem divides the finite simple groups of characteristic 2 type and rank at least 3 into three classes. It was proved by Michael Aschbacher for rank 3, and by Gorenstein and Lyons for rank at least 4. The three classes are groups of GF(2) type (classified by Timmesfeld and others), groups of "standard type" for some odd prime (classified by the Gilman–Griess theorem and work by several others), and groups of uniqueness type, where Aschbacher proved that there are no simple groups.
