= Baer–Suzuki theorem =

Theorem in mathematical finite group theory

In mathematics, namely finite group theory, the Baer–Suzuki theorem, proved by Baer (1957) and Suzuki (1965), states that if any two elements of a conjugacy class C of a finite group generate a nilpotent subgroup, then all elements of the conjugacy class C are contained in a nilpotent subgroup. Alperin & Lyons (1971) gave a short elementary proof.
