= Journal of Algebra =

- Discipline: Mathematics
- Language: English
- Edited by: Gunter Malle

Publication details
- History: 1964–present
- Impact factor: 0.9 (2022)

Standard abbreviations
- ISO 4: J. Algebra

Indexing
- ISSN: 0021-8693

Links
- Journal homepage

Journal of Algebra (ISSN 0021-8693) is an international mathematical research journal in algebra. An imprint of Academic Press, it is published by Elsevier. Journal of Algebra was founded by Graham Higman, who was its editor from 1964 to 1984. From 1985 until 2000, Walter Feit served as its editor-in-chief.

In 2004, Journal of Algebra announced (vol. 276, no. 1 and 2) the creation of a new section on computational algebra, with a separate editorial board. The first issue completely devoted to computational algebra was vol. 292, no. 1 (October 2005).

The Editor-in-Chief of the Journal of Algebra is Michel Broué, Université Paris Diderot, and Gerhard Hiß, Rheinisch-Westfälische Technische Hochschule Aachen (RWTH) is Editor of the computational algebra section.

== See also ==
- Susan Montgomery, an editor of the journal
