= Rudvalis group =

Sporadic simple group

In the area of modern algebra known as group theory, the Rudvalis group Ru is a sporadic simple group of order

145,926,144,000 = 2^{14} · 3^{3} · 5^{3} · 7 · 13 · 29
≈ 1×10^{11}.

== History ==
Ru is one of the 26 sporadic groups and was found by Arunas Rudvalis (1973, 1984) and constructed by John H. Conway and David B. Wales (1973). Its Schur multiplier has order 2, and its outer automorphism group is trivial.

In 1982 Robert Griess showed that Ru cannot be a subquotient of the monster group. Thus it is one of the 6 sporadic groups called the pariahs.

== Properties ==
The Rudvalis group acts as a rank 3 permutation group on 4060 points, with one point stabilizer being the Ree group ^{2}F_{4}(2), the automorphism group of the Tits group. This representation implies a strongly regular graph srg(4060, 2304, 1328, 1280). That is, each vertex has 2304 neighbors and 1755 non-neighbors, any two adjacent vertices have 1328 common neighbors, while any two non-adjacent ones have 1280 (Griess 1998, p. 125).

Its double cover acts on a 28-dimensional lattice over the Gaussian integers. The lattice has 4×4060 minimal vectors; if minimal vectors are identified whenever one is 1, i, –1, or –i times another, then the 4060 equivalence classes can be identified with the points of the rank 3 permutation representation. Reducing this lattice modulo the principal ideal

$$(1 + i)\$$

gives an action of the Rudvalis group on a 28-dimensional vector space over the field $\mathbb F_2$ with 2 elements. Duncan (2006) used the 28-dimensional lattice to construct a vertex operator algebra acted on by the double cover.

Alternatively, the double cover can be defined abstractly, by starting with the graph and lifting Ru to 2Ru in the double cover 2A_{4060}. This is because 1 of the conjugacy classes of involutions does not fix any points. Such an involution partitions the 4060 points of the graph into 2030 pairs, which can be regarded as 1015 double transpositions in the alternating group A_{4060}. Since 1015 is odd, these involutions are lifted to order 4 elements in the double cover 2A_{4060}. For more information, see Covering groups of the alternating and symmetric groups.

Parrott (1976) characterized the Rudvalis group by the centralizer of a central involution. Aschbacher & Smith (2004) gave another characterization as part of their identification of the Rudvalis group as one of the quasithin groups.

The degrees of irreducible representations of the Rudvalis group Ru are 1, 378, 378, 406, 783, 3276, 3654, 20475, ... (sequence A003918 in the OEIS).

== Maximal subgroups ==
Wilson (1984) found the 15 conjugacy classes of maximal subgroups of Ru as follows:

Maximal subgroups of Ru
No.	Structure	Order	Index	Comments
1	^{2}F_{4}(2) = ^{2}F_{4}(2)'.2	35,942,400 = 2^{12}·3^{3}·5^{2}·13	4,060 = 2^{2}·5·7·29	
2	2^{6}.U_{3}(3).2	774,144 = 2^{12}·3^{3}·7	188,500 = 2^{2}·5^{3}·13·29	
3	(2^{2} × Sz(8)):3	349,440 = 2^{8}·3·5·7·13	417,600 = 2^{6}·3^{2}·5^{2}·29	
4	2^{3+8}:L_{3}(2)	344,064 = 2^{14}·3·7	424,125 = 3^{2}·5^{3}·13·29	
5	U_{3}(5):2	252,000 = 2^{5}·3^{2}·5^{3}·7	579,072 = 2^{9}·3·13·29	
6	2^{1+4+6}.S_{5}	245,760 = 2^{14}·3·5	593,775 = 3^{2}·5^{2}·7·13·29	centralizer of an involution of class 2A
7	L_{2}(25).2^{2}	31,200 = 2^{5}·3·5^{2}·13	4,677,120 = 2^{9}·3^{2}·5·7·29	
8	A_{8}	20,160 = 2^{6}·3^{2}·5·7	7,238,400 = 2^{8}·3·5^{2}·13·29	
9	L_{2}(29)	12,180 = 2^{2}·3·5·7·29	11,980,800 = 2^{12}·3^{2}·5^{2}·13	
10	5^{2}:4.S_{5}	12,000 = 2^{5}·3·5^{3}	12,160,512 = 2^{9}·3^{2}·7·13·29	
11	3^{·}A_{6}.2^{2}	4,320 = 2^{5}·3^{3}·5	33,779,200 = 2^{9}·5^{2}·7·13·29	normalizer of a subgroup of order 3
12	5^{1+2}_{+}: [2^{5}]	4,000 = 2^{5}·5^{3}	36,481,536 = 2^{9}·3^{3}·7·13·29	normalizer of a subgroup of order 5 (class 5A)
13	L_{2}(13):2	2,184 = 2^{3}·3·7·13	66,816,000 = 2^{11}·3^{2}·5^{3}·29	
14	A_{6}.2^{2}	1,440 = 2^{5}·3^{2}·5	101,337,600 = 2^{9}·3·5^{2}·7·13·29	
15	5:4 × A_{5}	1,200 = 2^{4}·3·5^{2}	121,605,120 = 2^{10}·3^{2}·5·7·13·29	normalizer of a subgroup of order 5 (class 5B)
