= Characteristic 2 type =

In finite group theory, a branch of mathematics, a group is said to be of characteristic 2 type or even type or of even characteristic if it resembles a group of Lie type over a field of characteristic 2.

In the classification of finite simple groups, there is a major division between group of characteristic 2 type, where involutions resemble unipotent elements, and other groups, where involutions resemble semisimple elements.

Groups of characteristic 2 type and rank at least 3 are classified by the trichotomy theorem.

== Definitions ==
A group is said to be of even characteristic if

$C_M(O_2(M)) \le O_2(M)$ for all maximal 2-local subgroups M that contain a Sylow 2-subgroup of G,

where $O_2(M)$ denotes the 2-core, the largest normal 2-subgroup (subgroup in which the order of every element is a power of 2) of M, which is the intersection of all conjugates of any given Sylow 2-subgroup. If this condition holds for all maximal 2-local subgroups M then G is said to be of characteristic 2 type. Gorenstein, Lyons & Solomon (1994, p.55) use a modified version of this called even type.
