= Tits group =

Finite simple group; sometimes classed as sporadic

In group theory, the Tits group ^{2}F_{4}(2)′, named for Jacques Tits (French: [tits]), is a finite simple group of order

17,971,200 = 2^{11} · 3^{3} · 5^{2} · 13.

This is the only simple group that is a derivative of a group of Lie type that is not a group of Lie type in any series from exceptional isomorphisms. It is sometimes considered a 27th sporadic group.

== History and properties ==
The Ree groups ^{2}F_{4}(2^{2n+1}) were constructed by Ree (1961), who showed that they are simple if n ≥ 1. The first member ^{2}F_{4}(2) of this series is not simple. It was studied by Jacques Tits (1964) who showed that it is almost simple, its derived subgroup ^{2}F_{4}(2)′ of index 2 being a new simple group, now called the Tits group. The group ^{2}F_{4}(2) is a group of Lie type and has a BN pair, but the Tits group itself does not have a BN pair. The Tits group is member of the infinite family ^{2}F_{4}(2^{2n+1})′ of commutator groups of the Ree groups, and thus by definition not sporadic. But because it is also not strictly a group of Lie type, it is sometimes regarded as a 27th sporadic group.

The Schur multiplier of the Tits group is trivial and its outer automorphism group has order 2, with the full automorphism group being the group ^{2}F_{4}(2).

The Tits group occurs as a maximal subgroup of the Fischer group Fi_{22}. The group ^{2}F_{4}(2) also occurs as a maximal subgroup of the Rudvalis group, as the point stabilizer of the rank-3 permutation action on 4060 = 1 + 1755 + 2304 points.

The Tits group is one of the simple N-groups, and was not included in John G. Thompson's first announcement of the classification of simple N-groups, as it had not been discovered at the time. It is also one of the thin finite groups.

The Tits group was characterized in various ways by Parrott (1972, 1973) and Stroth (1980).

== Maximal subgroups ==
Wilson (1984) and Tchakerian (1986) independently found the 8 classes of maximal subgroups of the Tits group as follows:

Maximal subgroups of ^{2}F_{4}(2)′
No.	Structure	Order	Index	Comments
1,2	L_{3}(3):2	11,232 = 2^{5}·3^{3}·13	1,600 = 2^{6}·5^{2}	two classes, fused by an outer automorphism; fixes a point in a rank 4 permutation representation
3	2.[2^{8}]:5:4	10,240 = 2^{11}·5	1,755 = 3^{3}·5·13	centralizer of an involution of class 2A
4	L_{2}(25)	7,800 = 2^{3}·3·5^{2}·13	2,304 = 2^{8}·3^{2}	
5	2^{2}.[2^{8}]:S_{3}	6,144 = 2^{11}·3	2,925 = 3^{2}·5^{2}·13	
6,7	A_{6}^{·}2^{2}	1,440 = 2^{5}·3^{2}·5	12,480 = 2^{6}·3·5·13	two classes, fused by an outer automorphism
8	5^{2}:4A_{4}	1,200 = 2^{4}·3·5^{2}	14,976 = 2^{7}·3^{2}·13	

== Presentation ==
The Tits group can be defined in terms of generators and relations by

$$a^2 = b^3 = (ab)^{13} = [a, b]^5 = [a, bab]^4 = ((ab)^4 ab^{-1})^6 = 1, \,$$

where [a, b] is the commutator a^{−1}b^{−1}ab. It has an outer automorphism obtained by sending (a, b) to (a, b(ba)^{5}b(ba)^{5}).
