= Walter Feit =

Austrian-American mathematician

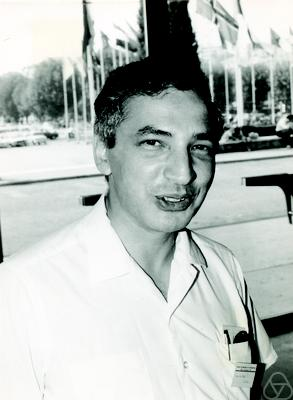
- Walter Feit at the ICM in Nice in 1970
- Born: October 26, 1930; Vienna, Austria
- Died: July 29, 2004 (aged 73); Branford, Connecticut
- Education: University of Michigan (Ph.D.); University of Chicago
- Known for: Feit–Thompson theorem
- Scientific career
- Fields: Mathematics
- Thesis: Topics In The Theory Of Group Characters (1955)
- Doctoral advisor: Robert McDowell Thrall

Walter Feit (October 26, 1930 – July 29, 2004) was an Austrian-born American mathematician who worked in finite group theory and representation theory. His contributions provided elementary infrastructure used in algebra, geometry, topology, number theory, and logic. His work helped the development and utilization of sectors like cryptography, chemistry, and physics.

He was born to a Jewish family in Vienna and escaped for England in 1939 via the Kindertransport. He moved to the United States in 1946 where he became an undergraduate at the University of Chicago. He completed his Ph.D. at the University of Michigan in 1955, and later became a professor at Cornell University, and at Yale University in 1964.

His most famous result is his proof, joint with John G. Thompson, of the Feit–Thompson theorem that all finite groups of odd order are solvable. At the time it was written, it was probably the most complicated and difficult mathematical proof ever completed.He wrote almost a hundred other papers, mostly on finite group theory, character theory (in particular introducing the concept of a coherent set of characters), and modular representation theory. Another regular theme in his research was the study of linear groups of small degree, that is, finite groups of matrices in low dimensions. It was often the case that, while the conclusions concerned groups of complex matrices, the techniques employed were from modular representation theory.

He also wrote the books:The representation theory of finite groups and Characters of finite groups, which are now standard references on character theory, including treatments of modular representations and modular characters.

Feit was an invited speaker at the International Congress of Mathematicians (ICM) in Nice in 1970. He was awarded the Cole Prize by the American Mathematical Society in 1965, and was elected to the United States National Academy of Sciences and the American Academy of Arts and Sciences. He also served as Vice-President of the International Mathematical Union.

"In October 2003, on the eve of Professor Feit's retirement, colleagues and former students gathered at Yale for a special four-day "Conference on Groups, Representations and Galois Theory" to honor him and his contributions. Nearly 80 researchers from around the world met to exchange ideas in the fields he had helped to create."

He died in Branford, Connecticut in 2004 and was survived by his wife, Dr. Sidnie Feit, and a son and daughter.

"A memorial service was held on Sunday, October 10, 2004, at the New Haven Lawn Club, 193 Whitney Avenue, New Haven, CT."

== Selected publications ==
- Feit, Walter (1982). The representation theory of finite groups. North Holland. ISBN 0-444-86155-6.
- Feit, Walter (1967). Characters of finite groups. New York: Benjamin.
