= Brauer–Suzuki–Wall theorem =

In mathematics, the Brauer–Suzuki–Wall theorem, proved by Brauer, Suzuki & Wall (1958), characterizes the one-dimensional unimodular projective groups over finite fields.
