= Finite group =

Mathematical group based upon a finite number of elements

In abstract algebra, a finite group is a group whose underlying set is finite. Finite groups often arise when considering symmetry of mathematical or physical objects, when those objects admit just a finite number of structure-preserving transformations. Important examples of finite groups include cyclic groups and permutation groups.

The study of finite groups has been an integral part of group theory since it arose in the 19th century. One major area of study has been classification: the classification of finite simple groups (those with no nontrivial normal subgroup) was completed in 2004.

== History ==
During the twentieth century, mathematicians investigated some aspects of the theory of finite groups in great depth, especially the local theory of finite groups and the theory of solvable and nilpotent groups. As a consequence, the complete classification of finite simple groups was achieved, meaning that all those simple groups from which all finite groups can be built are now known.

During the second half of the twentieth century, mathematicians such as Chevalley and Steinberg also increased the understanding of finite analogs of classical groups, and other related groups. One such family of groups is the family of general linear groups over finite fields.

Finite groups often occur when considering symmetry of mathematical or physical objects, when those objects admit just a finite number of structure-preserving transformations. The theory of Lie groups, which may be viewed as dealing with "continuous symmetry", is strongly influenced by the associated Weyl groups. These are finite groups generated by reflections which act on a finite-dimensional Euclidean space. The properties of finite groups can thus play a role in subjects such as theoretical physics and chemistry.

== Examples ==
=== Permutation groups ===
A Cayley graph of the symmetric group S_{4}

The symmetric group S_{n} on a finite set of n symbols is the group whose elements are all the permutations of the n symbols, and whose group operation is the composition of such permutations, which are treated as bijective functions from the set of symbols to itself. Since there are n! (n factorial) possible permutations of a set of n symbols, it follows that the order (the number of elements) of the symmetric group S_{n} is n!.

=== Cyclic groups ===
A cyclic group Z_{n} is a group all of whose elements are powers of a particular element a where a^{n} = a^{0} = e, the identity. A typical realization of this group is as the complex nth roots of unity. Sending a to a primitive root of unity gives an isomorphism between the two. This can be done with any finite cyclic group.

=== Finite abelian groups ===
An abelian group, also called a commutative group, is a group in which the result of applying the group operation to two group elements does not depend on their order (the axiom of commutativity). They are named after Niels Henrik Abel.

An arbitrary finite abelian group is isomorphic to a direct sum of finite cyclic groups of prime power order, and these orders are uniquely determined, forming a complete system of invariants. The automorphism group of a finite abelian group can be described directly in terms of these invariants. The theory had been first developed in the 1879 paper of Georg Frobenius and Ludwig Stickelberger and later was both simplified and generalized to finitely generated modules over a principal ideal domain, forming an important chapter of linear algebra.

=== Groups of Lie type ===
A group of Lie type is a group closely related to the group G(k) of rational points of a reductive linear algebraic group G with values in the field k. Finite groups of Lie type give the bulk of nonabelian finite simple groups. Special cases include the classical groups, the Chevalley groups, the Steinberg groups, and the Suzuki–Ree groups.

Finite groups of Lie type were among the first groups to be considered in mathematics, after cyclic, symmetric and alternating groups, with the projective special linear groups over prime finite fields, PSL(2, p) being constructed by Évariste Galois in the 1830s. The systematic exploration of finite groups of Lie type started with Camille Jordan's theorem that the projective special linear group PSL(2, q) is simple for q ≠ 2, 3. This theorem generalizes to projective groups of higher dimensions and gives an important infinite family PSL(n, q) of finite simple groups. Other classical groups were studied by Leonard Dickson in the beginning of 20th century. In the 1950s Claude Chevalley realized that after an appropriate reformulation, many theorems about semisimple Lie groups admit analogues for algebraic groups over an arbitrary field k, leading to construction of what are now called Chevalley groups. Moreover, as in the case of compact simple Lie groups, the corresponding groups turned out to be almost simple as abstract groups (Tits simplicity theorem). Although it was known since 19th century that other finite simple groups exist (for example, Mathieu groups), gradually a belief formed that nearly all finite simple groups can be accounted for by appropriate extensions of Chevalley's construction, together with cyclic and alternating groups. Moreover, the exceptions, the sporadic groups, share many properties with the finite groups of Lie type, and in particular, can be constructed and characterized based on their geometry in the sense of Tits.

The belief has now become a theorem – the classification of finite simple groups. Inspection of the list of finite simple groups shows that groups of Lie type over a finite field include all the finite simple groups other than the cyclic groups, the alternating groups, the Tits group, and the 26 sporadic simple groups.

== Main theorems ==
=== Lagrange's theorem ===
For any finite group G, the order (number of elements) of every subgroup H of G divides the order of G. The theorem is named after Joseph-Louis Lagrange.

=== Sylow theorems ===
This provides a partial converse to Lagrange's theorem giving information about how many subgroups of a given order are contained in G.

=== Cayley's theorem ===
Cayley's theorem, named in honour of Arthur Cayley, states that every group G is isomorphic to a subgroup of the symmetric group acting on G. This can be understood as an example of the group action of G on the elements of G.

=== Burnside's theorem ===
Burnside's theorem in group theory states that if G is a finite group of order p^{a}q^{b}, where p and q are prime numbers, and a and b are non-negative integers, then G is solvable. Hence each non-Abelian finite simple group has order divisible by at least three distinct primes.

=== Feit–Thompson theorem ===
The Feit–Thompson theorem, or odd order theorem, states that every finite group of odd order is solvable. It was proved by Walter Feit and John Griggs Thompson (1962, 1963)

=== Classification of finite simple groups ===
The classification of finite simple groups is a theorem stating that every finite simple group belongs to one of the following families:

- A cyclic group with prime order;
- An alternating group of degree at least 5;
- A simple group of Lie type;
- One of the 26 sporadic simple groups;
- The Tits group (sometimes considered as a 27th sporadic group).

The finite simple groups can be seen as the basic building blocks of all finite groups, in a way reminiscent of the way the prime numbers are the basic building blocks of the natural numbers. The Jordan–Hölder theorem is a more precise way of stating this fact about finite groups. However, a significant difference with respect to the case of integer factorization is that such "building blocks" do not necessarily determine uniquely a group, since there might be many non-isomorphic groups with the same composition series or, put in another way, the extension problem does not have a unique solution.

The proof of the theorem consists of tens of thousands of pages in several hundred journal articles written by about 100 authors, published mostly between 1955 and 2004. Gorenstein (d.1992), Lyons, and Solomon are gradually publishing a simplified and revised version of the proof.

== Number of groups of a given order ==
Given a positive integer n, it is not at all a routine matter to determine how many isomorphism types of groups of order n there are. Every group of prime order is cyclic, because Lagrange's theorem implies that the cyclic subgroup generated by any of its non-identity elements is the whole group. If n is the square of a prime, then there are exactly two possible isomorphism types of group of order n, both of which are abelian. If n is a higher power of a prime, then results of Graham Higman and Charles Sims give asymptotically correct estimates for the number of isomorphism types of groups of order n, and the number grows very rapidly as the power increases.

Depending on the prime factorization of n, some restrictions may be placed on the structure of groups of order n, as a consequence, for example, of results such as the Sylow theorems. For example, every group of order pq is cyclic when q < p are primes with p − 1 not divisible by q. For a necessary and sufficient condition, see cyclic number.

If n is squarefree, then any group of order n is solvable. Burnside's theorem, proved using group characters, states that every group of order n is solvable when n is divisible by fewer than three distinct primes, i.e. if n = p^{a}q^{b}, where p and q are prime numbers, and a and b are non-negative integers. By the Feit–Thompson theorem, which has a long and complicated proof, every group of order n is solvable when n is odd.

For every positive integer n, most groups of order n are solvable. To see this for any particular order is usually not difficult (for example, there is, up to isomorphism, one non-solvable group and 12 solvable groups of order 60) but the proof of this for all orders uses the classification of finite simple groups. For any positive integer n there are at most two simple groups of order n, and there are infinitely many positive integers n for which there are two non-isomorphic simple groups of order n.

=== Table of distinct groups of order n ===
Order n	# Groups	Abelian	Non-Abelian
0	0	0	0
1	1	1	0
2	1	1	0
3	1	1	0
4	2	2	0
5	1	1	0
6	2	1	1
7	1	1	0
8	5	3	2
9	2	2	0
10	2	1	1
11	1	1	0
12	5	2	3
13	1	1	0
14	2	1	1
15	1	1	0
16	14	5	9
17	1	1	0
18	5	2	3
19	1	1	0
20	5	2	3
21	2	1	1
22	2	1	1
23	1	1	0
24	15	3	12
25	2	2	0
26	2	1	1
27	5	3	2
28	4	2	2
29	1	1	0
30	4	1	3
31	1	1	0
32	51	7	44
33	1	1	0

== See also ==
- Association scheme
- Cauchy's theorem (group theory)
- Classification of finite simple groups
- Commuting graph
- Commuting probability
- Finite ring
- Finite-state machine
- Infinite group
- List of finite simple groups
- List of small groups
- Modular representation theory
- Monstrous moonshine
- P-group
- Profinite group
- Representation theory of finite groups
