= Daniel Gorenstein =

American mathematician (1923–1992)

Daniel E. Gorenstein
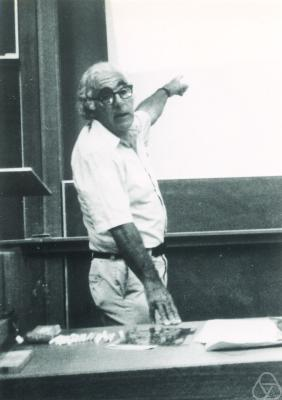
- Born: January 1, 1923; Boston, Massachusetts, US
- Died: August 26, 1992 (aged 69); Martha's Vineyard, Massachusetts
- Education: Harvard University (A.B., M.A., Ph.D.)
- Known for: Gorenstein rings Classification of simple finite groups
- Awards: Steele Prize (1989)
- Scientific career
- Fields: Mathematics
- Workplaces: Clark University; Northeastern University; Rutgers University
- Thesis: An Arithmetic Theory of Adjoint Plane Curves (1950)
- Doctoral advisor: Oscar Zariski
- Doctoral students: Michael O'Nan

Daniel E. Gorenstein (January 1, 1923 – August 26, 1992) was an American mathematician best remembered for his contribution to the classification of finite simple groups.

Gorenstein mastered calculus at age 12 and subsequently matriculated at Harvard University, where he earned his bachelor's and master's degrees. During the Second World War, he taught mathematics to military personnel. After the war, he stayed at Harvard and earned his PhD 1950 under the supervision of Oscar Zariski. In his dissertation, Gorenstein introduced a duality principle for plane curves that motivated Alexander Grothendieck's introduction of Gorenstein rings. Gorenstein held posts at Clark University and Northeastern University, before moving to Rutgers University in 1969, where he remained for the rest of his life. He became the founding director of the Center for Discrete Mathematics and Theoretical Computer Science (DIMACS) at Rutgers in 1989, and remained at this post until his death.

He was recognized, in addition to his own research contributions such as work on signalizer functors, as a leader in directing the classification of finite simple groups, one of the largest collaborative pieces of pure mathematics ever attempted. In 1972, he was a Guggenheim Fellow and a Fulbright Scholar. In 1978, he gained membership in the National Academy of Sciences and the American Academy of Arts and Sciences. In 1989, Gorenstein won the Steele Prize in mathematical exposition from the American Mathematical Society for his book Finite Simple Groups: An Introduction to Their Classification (1982). In 1985, he wrote an article explaining his mathematical work to the layperson for Scientific American.

He died in 1992 after a brief illness. He was 69 years old.

== See also ==
- Gorenstein–Harada theorem
- Gorenstein–Walter theorem
- Peterson–Gorenstein–Zierler algorithm
