= Simple group =

Group without normal subgroups other than the trivial group and itself

In mathematics, a simple group is a nontrivial group whose only normal subgroups are the trivial group and the group itself. A group that is not simple can be broken into two smaller groups, namely a nontrivial normal subgroup and the corresponding quotient group. This process can be repeated, and for finite groups one eventually arrives at uniquely determined simple groups, by the Jordan–Hölder theorem.

The complete classification of finite simple groups, completed in 2004, is a major milestone in the history of mathematics.

== Examples ==
=== Finite simple groups ===
The cyclic group $G=(\mathbb{Z}/3\mathbb{Z},+)=\mathbb{Z}_3$ of congruence classes modulo 3 (see modular arithmetic) is simple. If $H$ is a subgroup of this group, its order (the number of elements) must be a divisor of the order of $G$ which is 3. Since 3 is prime, its only divisors are 1 and 3, so either $H$ is $G$, or $H$ is the trivial group. On the other hand, the group $G=(\mathbb{Z}/12\mathbb{Z},+)=\mathbb{Z}_{12}$ is not simple. The set $H$ of congruence classes of 0, 4, and 8 modulo 12 is a subgroup of order 3, and it is a normal subgroup since any subgroup of an abelian group is normal. Similarly, the additive group of the integers $(\mathbb{Z},+)$ is not simple; the set of even integers is a non-trivial proper normal subgroup.

One may use the same kind of reasoning for any abelian group, to deduce that the only simple abelian groups are the cyclic groups of prime order. The classification of nonabelian simple groups is far less trivial. The smallest nonabelian simple group is the alternating group $A_5$ of order 60, and every simple group of order 60 is isomorphic to $A_5$. The second smallest nonabelian simple group is the projective special linear group PSL(2,7) of order 168, and every simple group of order 168 is isomorphic to PSL(2,7).

=== Infinite simple groups ===
The infinite alternating group $A_\infty$, i.e. the group of even finitely supported permutations of the integers, is simple. This group can be written as the increasing union of the finite simple groups $A_n$ with respect to standard embeddings $A_n \rightarrow A_{n+1}$. Another family of examples of infinite simple groups is given by $PSL_n(F)$, where $F$ is an infinite field and $n\geq2$.

It is much more difficult to construct finitely generated infinite simple groups. The first existence result is non-explicit; it is due to Graham Higman and consists of simple quotients of the Higman group. Explicit examples, which turn out to be finitely presented, include the infinite Thompson groups $T$ and $V$. Finitely presented torsion-free infinite simple groups were constructed by Burger and Mozes.

== Classification ==
There is as yet no known classification for general (infinite) simple groups, and no such classification is expected. One reason for this is the existence of continuum-many Tarski monster groups for every sufficiently-large prime characteristic, each simple and having only the cyclic group of that characteristic as its subgroups.

=== Finite simple groups ===
The finite simple groups are important because in a certain sense they are the "basic building blocks" of all finite groups, somewhat similar to the way prime numbers are the basic building blocks of the integers. This is expressed by the Jordan–Hölder theorem which states that any two composition series of a given group have the same length and the same factors, up to permutation and isomorphism. In a huge collaborative effort, the classification of finite simple groups was declared accomplished in 1983 by Daniel Gorenstein, though some problems surfaced (specifically in the classification of quasithin groups, which were plugged in 2004).

Briefly, finite simple groups are classified as lying in one of 18 families, or being one of 26 exceptions:

- $\mathbb{Z}_p$ – cyclic group of prime order
- $A_n$ – alternating group for $n\geq5$
  The alternating groups may be considered as groups of Lie type over the field with one element, which unites this family with the next, and thus all families of non-abelian finite simple groups may be considered to be of Lie type.
- One of 16 families of groups of Lie type or their derivatives
  The Tits group is generally considered of this form, though strictly speaking it is not of Lie type, but rather index 2 in a group of Lie type.
- One of 26 exceptions, the sporadic groups, of which 20 are subgroups or subquotients of the monster group and are referred to as the "Happy Family", while the remaining 6 are referred to as pariahs.

== Structure of finite simple groups ==
The famous theorem of Feit and Thompson states that every group of odd order is solvable. Therefore, every finite simple group has even order unless it is cyclic of prime order.

The Schreier conjecture asserts that the group of outer automorphisms of every finite simple group is solvable. This can be proved using the classification theorem.

== History for finite simple groups ==
There are two threads in the history of finite simple groups – the discovery and construction of specific simple groups and families, which took place from the work of Galois in the 1820s to the construction of the Monster in 1981; and proof that this list was complete, which began in the 19th century, most significantly took place 1955 through 1983 (when victory was initially declared), but was only generally agreed to be finished in 2004. By 2018, its publication was envisioned as a series of 12 monographs, the tenth of which was published in 2023. See (Silvestri 1979) for 19th century history of simple groups.

=== Construction ===
Simple groups have been studied at least since early Galois theory, where Évariste Galois realized that the fact that the alternating groups on five or more points are simple (and hence not solvable), which he proved in 1831, was the reason that one could not solve the quintic in radicals. Galois also constructed the projective special linear group of a plane over a prime finite field, PSL(2,p), and remarked that they were simple for p not 2 or 3. This is contained in his last letter to Chevalier, and are the next example of finite simple groups.

The next discoveries were by Camille Jordan in 1870. Jordan had found 4 families of simple matrix groups over finite fields of prime order, which are now known as the classical groups.

At about the same time, it was shown that a family of five groups, called the Mathieu groups and first described by Émile Léonard Mathieu in 1861 and 1873, were also simple. Since these five groups were constructed by methods which did not yield infinitely many possibilities, they were called "sporadic" by William Burnside in his 1897 textbook.

Later Jordan's results on classical groups were generalized to arbitrary finite fields by Leonard Dickson, following the classification of complex simple Lie algebras by Wilhelm Killing. Dickson also constructed exception groups of type G_{2} and E_{6} as well, but not of types F_{4}, E_{7}, or E_{8} (Wilson 2009, p. 2). In the 1950s the work on groups of Lie type was continued, with Claude Chevalley giving a uniform construction of the classical groups and the groups of exceptional type in a 1955 paper. This omitted certain known groups (the projective unitary groups), which were obtained by "twisting" the Chevalley construction. The remaining groups of Lie type were produced by Steinberg, Tits, and Herzig (who produced ^{3}D_{4}(q) and ^{2}E_{6}(q)) and by Suzuki and Ree (the Suzuki–Ree groups).

These groups (the groups of Lie type, together with the cyclic groups, alternating groups, and the five exceptional Mathieu groups) were believed to be a complete list, but after a lull of almost a century since the work of Mathieu, in 1964 the first Janko group was discovered, and the remaining 20 sporadic groups were discovered or conjectured in 1965–1975, culminating in 1981, when Robert Griess announced that he had constructed Bernd Fischer's "Monster group". The Monster is the largest sporadic simple group having order of 808,017,424,794,512,875,886,459,904,961,710,757,005,754,368,000,000,000. The Monster has a faithful 196,883-dimensional representation in the 196,884-dimensional Griess algebra, meaning that each element of the Monster can be expressed as a 196,883 by 196,883 matrix.

=== Classification ===
The full classification is generally accepted as beginning with the Feit–Thompson theorem of 1962–1963 and being completed in 2004.

Soon after the construction of the Monster in 1981, a proof, totaling more than 10,000 pages, was supplied in 1983 by Daniel Gorenstein, that claimed to successfully list all finite simple groups. This was premature, as gaps were later discovered in the classification of quasithin groups. The gaps were filled in 2004 by a 1300 page classification of quasithin groups and the proof is now generally accepted as complete.

== Tests for nonsimplicity ==
Sylow's test: Let n be a positive integer that is not prime, and let p be a prime divisor of n. If 1 is the only divisor of n that is congruent to 1 modulo p, then there does not exist a simple group of order n.

Proof: If n is a prime-power, then a group of order n has a nontrivial center and, therefore, is not simple. If n is not a prime power, then every Sylow subgroup is proper, and, by Sylow's Third Theorem, we know that the number of Sylow p-subgroups of a group of order n is equal to 1 modulo p and divides n. Since 1 is the only such number, the Sylow p-subgroup is unique, and therefore it is normal. Since it is a proper, non-identity subgroup, the group is not simple.

Burnside: A non-Abelian finite simple group has order divisible by at least three distinct primes. This follows from Burnside's theorem.

== See also ==
- Almost simple group
- Characteristically simple group
- Quasisimple group
- Semisimple group
- Simple (abstract algebra)
- List of finite simple groups
