= Sylow theorems =

Theorems that help decompose a finite group based on prime factors of its order

In mathematics, specifically in the field of finite group theory, the Sylow theorems are a collection of theorems named after the Norwegian mathematician Peter Ludwig Sylow that give detailed information about the number of subgroups of fixed order that a given finite group contains. The Sylow theorems form a fundamental part of finite group theory and have very important applications in the classification of finite simple groups.

For a prime number $p$, a p-group is a group in which the order of every element is a power of $p$; for finite groups, this is equivalent to the group's cardinality being a power of $p$. A Sylow p-subgroup of a group $G$ is a maximal $p$-subgroup—that is, a p-subgroup of $G$ not contained in any strictly larger p-subgroup. The set of all Sylow $p$-subgroups of $G$ for a given prime $p$ is denoted $\text{Syl}_p(G)$.

The Sylow theorems assert a partial converse to Lagrange's theorem. Lagrange's theorem states that for any finite group $G$ the order (number of elements) of every subgroup of $G$ divides the order of $G$. The Sylow theorems state that for every prime factor $p$ of the order of a finite group $G$, there exists a Sylow $p$-subgroup of $G$ of order $p^n$, the highest power of $p$ that divides the order of $G$. Moreover, every subgroup of order $p^n$ is a Sylow $p$-subgroup of $G$, and the Sylow $p$-subgroups of a group (for a given prime $p$) are conjugate to each other. Furthermore, the number of Sylow $p$-subgroups of a group for a given prime $p$ is congruent to 1 (mod $p$).

== Theorems ==
=== Motivation ===
The Sylow theorems are a powerful statement about the structure of groups in general, but are also powerful in applications of finite group theory. This is because they give a method for using the prime decomposition of the cardinality of a finite group $G$ to give statements about the structure of its subgroups: essentially, it gives a technique to transport basic number-theoretic information about a group to its group structure. From this observation, classifying finite groups becomes a game of finding which combinations/constructions of groups of smaller order can be applied to construct a group. For example, a typical application of these theorems is in the classification of finite groups of some fixed cardinality, e.g. $|G| = 60$.

=== Statement ===
Collections of subgroups that are each maximal in one sense or another are common in group theory. The surprising result here is that in the case of $\operatorname{Syl}_p(G)$, all members are actually isomorphic to each other and have the largest possible order: if $|G|=p^nm$ with $n > 0$ where p does not divide m, then every Sylow p-subgroup P has order $|P| = p^n$. That is, P is a p-group and $\text{gcd}(|G:P|, p) = 1$. These properties can be exploited to further analyze the structure of G.

The following theorems were first proposed and proven by Ludwig Sylow in 1872, and published in Mathematische Annalen.

Theorem (1)—For every prime factor p with multiplicity n of the order of a finite group G, there exists a Sylow p-subgroup of G, of order $p^n$.

The following weaker version of theorem 1 was first proved by Augustin-Louis Cauchy, and is known as Cauchy's theorem.

Corollary—Given a finite group G and a prime number p dividing the order of G, then there exists an element (and thus a cyclic subgroup generated by this element) of order p in G.

Theorem (2)—Given a finite group G and a prime number p, all Sylow p-subgroups of G are conjugate to each other. That is, if H and K are Sylow p-subgroups of G, then there exists an element $g \in G$ with $g^{-1}Hg = K$.

Theorem (3)—Let p be a prime factor with multiplicity n of the order of a finite group G, so that the order of G can be written as $p^nm$, where $n > 0$ and p does not divide m. Let $n_p$ be the number of Sylow p-subgroups of G. Then the following hold:

- $n_p$ divides m, which is the index of the Sylow p-subgroup in G.
- $n_p \equiv 1 \pmod{p}$
- $n_p = |G:N_G (P)|$, where P is any Sylow p-subgroup of G and $N_G$ denotes the normalizer.

=== Consequences ===
If $p^m$is any prime power dividing the order of $G$, then there exists a subgroup of $G$ of order $p^m$. This is easily shown to be true for p-groups, and the first Sylow theorem guarantees the existence of a large enough p-subgroup of $G$.

The Sylow theorems imply that for a prime number $p$ all Sylow $p$-subgroups of $G$ have the same order, $p^n$, the highest power of $p$ dividing the order of $G$. Conversely, all subgroups of order $p^n$are Sylow $p$-subgroup, and so they are all conjugate to each other. Further, due to the maximality condition, any $p$-subgroup of $G$ is subgroup of a $p$-subgroup of $G$ of order $p^n$.

An important consequence of Theorem 2 is that the condition $n_p = 1$ is equivalent to the condition that the Sylow $p$-subgroup of $G$ is a normal subgroup (Theorem 3 can often be used to show $n_p = 1$). However, there are groups that have proper, non-trivial normal subgroups but no normal Sylow subgroups, such as $S_4$. Groups that are of prime-power order have no proper Sylow $p$-subgroups.

The third bullet point of the third theorem has as an immediate consequence that $n_p$ divides $|G|$.

=== Sylow theorems for infinite groups ===
There is an analogue of the Sylow theorems for infinite groups. One defines a Sylow p-subgroup in an infinite group to be a p-subgroup (that is, every element in it has p-power order) that is maximal for inclusion among all p-subgroups in the group. Let $\operatorname{Cl}(K)$ denote the set of conjugates of a subgroup $K \subset G$.

Theorem—If K is a Sylow p-subgroup of G, and $n_p = |\operatorname{Cl}(K)|$ is finite, then every Sylow p-subgroup is conjugate to K, and $n_p \equiv 1\ (\mathrm{mod}\ p)$.

== Examples ==
In D_{6} all reflections are conjugate, as reflections correspond to Sylow 2-subgroups.

A simple illustration of Sylow subgroups and the Sylow theorems are the dihedral group of the n-gon, D_{2n}. For n odd, 2 = 2^{1} is the highest power of 2 dividing the order, and thus subgroups of order 2 are Sylow subgroups. These are the groups generated by a reflection, of which there are n, and they are all conjugate under rotations; geometrically the axes of symmetry pass through a vertex and a side.

In D_{12} reflections no longer correspond to Sylow 2-subgroups, and fall into two conjugacy classes.

By contrast, if n is even, then 4 divides the order of the group, and the subgroups of order 2 are no longer Sylow subgroups, and in fact they fall into two conjugacy classes, geometrically according to whether they pass through two vertices or two faces. These are related by an outer automorphism, which can be represented by rotation through π/n, half the minimal rotation in the dihedral group.

Another example are the Sylow p-subgroups of GL_{2}(F_{q}), where p and q are primes ≥ 3 and p ≡ 1 (mod q) , which are all abelian. The order of GL_{2}(F_{q}) is (q^{2} − 1)(q^{2} − q) = (q)(q + 1)(q − 1)^{2}. Since q = p^{n}m + 1, the order of GL_{2}(F_{q}) = p^{2n} m′. Thus by Theorem 1, the order of the Sylow p-subgroups is p^{2n}.

One such subgroup P, is the set of diagonal matrices
$$\begin{bmatrix}x^{im} & 0 \\0 & x^{jm} \end{bmatrix}$$
, x is any primitive root of F_{q}. Since the order of F_{q} is q − 1, its primitive roots have order q − 1, which implies that x^{(q − 1)/p^{n}} or x^{m} and all its powers have an order which is a power of p. So, P is a subgroup where all its elements have orders which are powers of p. There are p^{n} choices for both a and b, making |P| = p^{2n}. This means P is a Sylow p-subgroup, which is abelian, as all diagonal matrices commute, and because Theorem 2 states that all Sylow p-subgroups are conjugate to each other, the Sylow p-subgroups of GL_{2}(F_{q}) are all abelian.

== Example applications ==
Since Sylow's theorem ensures the existence of p-subgroups of a finite group, it is worthwhile to study groups of prime power order more closely. Most of the examples use Sylow's theorem to prove that a group of a particular order is not simple. For groups of small order, the congruence condition of Sylow's theorem is often sufficient to force the existence of a normal subgroup. Burnside's p^{a} q^{b} theorem states that if the order of a group is the product of one or two prime powers, then it is solvable, hence not simple (except if it is cyclic of prime order).

=== Cyclic group orders ===
Some non-prime numbers n are such that every group of order n is cyclic. One can show that n = 15 is such a number using the Sylow theorems: Let G be a group of order 15 = 3 · 5 and n_{3} be the number of Sylow 3-subgroups. Then n_{3} $\mid$ 5 and n_{3} ≡ 1 (mod 3). The only value satisfying these constraints is 1; therefore, there is only one subgroup of order 3, and it must be normal (since it has no distinct conjugates). Similarly, n_{5} must divide 3, and n_{5} must equal 1 (mod 5); thus it must also have a single normal subgroup of order 5. Since 3 and 5 are coprime, the intersection of these two subgroups is trivial, and so G must be the internal direct product of groups of order 3 and 5, that is the cyclic group of order 15. Thus, there is only one group of order 15 (up to isomorphism).

More generally, one can show with a similar argument that if n = pq, where p and q are distinct prime numbers such that p does not divide q-1, then every group of order n is cyclic. If p does divide q − 1, there is one noncyclic group of order n up to isomorphism; it has presentation

$$\langle a,b \mid a^p, b^q, aba^{-1}b^{-k}\rangle$$

for any 2 ≤ k ≤ q − 1 for which k^{p} ≡ 1 (mod q). For instance, the dihedral group D_{p}, where p is an odd prime, has order 2p but is not cyclic.

=== Small groups are not simple ===
A more complicated application is to find the order of the smallest simple group that is not cyclic. Burnside's p^{a} q^{b} theorem rules out every group up to order 30 = 2 · 3 · 5.

If |G| = 30 and G were simple, then n_{3} > 1 to avoid a normal 3-subgroup, and n_{3} must both divide 10 = 2 · 5 and equal 1 (mod 3), hence n_{3} = 10. The group then has 10 distinct cyclic subgroups of order 3, each with 2 elements of order 3. This means G has at least 20 distinct elements of order 3. Similarly, n_{5} = 6, since n_{5} > 1 must divide 6 = 2 · 3, and n_{5} must equal 1 (mod 5). Thus G also has 24 distinct elements of order 5. But the order of G is only 30, so a simple group of order 30 cannot exist.

Next suppose |G| = 42 = 2 · 3 · 7 and G were simple. Here n_{7} > 1 must divide 6 = 2 · 3 and n_{7} must equal 1 (mod 7), which is impossible.

On the other hand, if |G| = 60 = 2^{2} · 3 · 5, then n_{3} = 10 and n_{5} = 6 is perfectly possible. In fact, the smallest simple non-cyclic group is A_{5}, the alternating group over 5 elements. It has order 60, and has 24 cyclic permutations of order 5, and 20 of order 3. In fact, if |G| = 60 and n_{5} > 1, then G is simple.

=== Wilson's theorem ===
Part of Wilson's theorem states that

$$(p-1)! \equiv -1 \pmod p$$

for every prime p. One may easily prove this theorem by Sylow's third theorem. Indeed, observe that the number n_{p} of Sylow's p-subgroups in the symmetric group S_{p} is 1/(p − 1) times the number of p-cycles in S_{p}, ie. (p − 2)!. On the other hand, n_{p} ≡ 1 (mod p). Hence, (p − 2)! ≡ 1 (mod p). So, (p − 1)! ≡ −1 (mod p).

=== Fusion results ===
Frattini's argument shows that a Sylow subgroup of a normal subgroup provides a factorization of a finite group. A slight generalization known as Burnside's fusion theorem states that if G is a finite group with Sylow p-subgroup P and two subsets A and B normalized by P, then A and B are G-conjugate if and only if they are N_{G}(P)-conjugate. The proof is a simple application of Sylow's theorem: If B=A^{g}, then the normalizer of B contains not only P but also P^{g} (since P^{g} is contained in the normalizer of A^{g}). By Sylow's theorem P and P^{g} are conjugate not only in G, but in the normalizer of B. Hence gh^{−1} normalizes P for some h that normalizes B, and then A^{gh^{−1}} = B^{h^{−1}} = B, so that A and B are N_{G}(P)-conjugate. Burnside's fusion theorem can be used to give a more powerful factorization called a semidirect product: if G is a finite group whose Sylow p-subgroup P is contained in the center of its normalizer, then G has a normal subgroup K of order coprime to P, G = PK and P∩K = {1}, that is, G is p-nilpotent.

Less trivial applications of the Sylow theorems include the focal subgroup theorem, which studies the control a Sylow p-subgroup of the derived subgroup has on the structure of the entire group. This control is exploited at several stages of the classification of finite simple groups, and for instance defines the case divisions used in the Alperin–Brauer–Gorenstein theorem classifying finite simple groups whose Sylow 2-subgroup is a quasi-dihedral group. These rely on J. L. Alperin's strengthening of the conjugacy portion of Sylow's theorem to control what sorts of elements are used in the conjugation.

== Proof of the Sylow theorems ==
The Sylow theorems have been proved in a number of ways, and the history of the proofs themselves is the subject of many papers, including Waterhouse, Scharlau, Casadio and Zappa, Gow, and to some extent Meo.

One proof of the Sylow theorems exploits the notion of group action in various creative ways. The group G acts on itself or on the set of its p-subgroups in various ways, and each such action can be exploited to prove one of the Sylow theorems. The following proofs are based on combinatorial arguments of Wielandt. In the following, we use $a \mid b$ as notation for "a divides b" and $a \nmid b$ for the negation of this statement.

Theorem (1)—A finite group G whose order $|G|$ is divisible by a prime power p^{k} has a subgroup of order p^{k}.

Proof

Let |G| = p^{k}m = p^{k+r}u such that $p \nmid u$, and let Ω denote the set of subsets of G of size p^{k}. G acts on Ω by left multiplication: for g ∈ G and ω ∈ Ω, g⋅ω = { gx | x ∈ ω }. For a given set ω ∈ Ω, write G_{ω} for its stabilizer subgroup { g ∈ G | g⋅ω = ω } and Gω for its orbit { g⋅ω | g ∈ G } in Ω.

The proof will show the existence of some ω ∈ Ω for which G_{ω} has p^{k} elements, providing the desired subgroup. This is the maximal possible size of a stabilizer subgroup G_{ω}, since for any fixed element α ∈ ω ⊆ G, the right coset G_{ω}α is contained in ω; therefore, |G_{ω}| = |G_{ω}α| ≤ |ω| = p^{k}.

By the orbit-stabilizer theorem we have |G_{ω}| |Gω| = |G| for each ω ∈ Ω, and therefore using the additive p-adic valuation ν_{p}, which counts the number of factors p, one has ν_{p}(|G_{ω}|) + ν_{p}(|Gω|) = ν_{p}(|G|) = k + r. This means that for those ω with |G_{ω}| = p^{k}, the ones we are looking for, one has ν_{p}(|Gω|) = r, while for any other ω one has ν_{p}(|Gω|) > r (as 0 < |G_{ω}| < p^{k} implies ν_{p}(|G_{ω}|) < k). Since |Ω| is the sum of |Gω| over all distinct orbits Gω, one can show the existence of ω of the former type by showing that ν_{p}(|Ω|) = r (if none existed, that valuation would exceed r). This is an instance of Kummer's theorem (since in base p notation the number |G| ends with precisely k + r digits zero, subtracting p^{k} from it involves a carry in r places), and can also be shown by a simple computation:

$$|\Omega | ={p^km \choose p^k} = \prod_{j=0}^{p^k - 1} \frac{p^k m - j}{p^k - j} =  m\prod_{j=1}^{p^{k} - 1} \frac{p^{k - \nu_p(j)} m - j/p^{\nu_p(j)}}{p^{k - \nu_p(j)} - j/p^{\nu_p(j)}}$$

and no power of p remains in any of the factors inside the product on the right. Hence ν_{p}(|Ω|) = ν_{p}(m) = r, completing the proof.

It may be noted that conversely every subgroup H of order p^{k} gives rise to sets ω ∈ Ω for which G_{ω} = H, namely any one of the m distinct cosets Hg.

Lemma—Let H be a finite p-group, let Ω be a finite set acted on by H, and let Ω_{0} denote the set of points of Ω that are fixed under the action of H. Then |Ω| ≡ |Ω_{0}| (mod p).

Proof

Any element x ∈ Ω not fixed by H will lie in an orbit of order |H|/|H_{x}| (where H_{x} denotes the stabilizer), which is a multiple of p by assumption. The result follows immediately by writing |Ω| as the sum of |Hx| over all distinct orbits Hx and reducing mod p.

Theorem (2)—If H is a p-subgroup of G and P is a Sylow p-subgroup of G, then there exists an element g in G such that g^{−1}Hg ≤ P. In particular, all Sylow p-subgroups of G are conjugate to each other (and therefore isomorphic), that is, if H and K are Sylow p-subgroups of G, then there exists an element g in G with g^{−1}Hg = K.

Proof

Let Ω be the set of left cosets of P in G and let H act on Ω by left multiplication. Applying the Lemma to H on Ω, we see that |Ω_{0}| ≡ |Ω| = [G : P] (mod p). Now $p \nmid [G:P]$ by definition so $p \nmid |\Omega_0|$, hence in particular |Ω_{0}| ≠ 0 so there exists some gP ∈ Ω_{0}. With this gP, we have hgP = gP for all h ∈ H, so g^{−1}HgP = P and therefore g^{−1}Hg ≤ P. Furthermore, if H is a Sylow p-subgroup, then |g^{−1}Hg| = |H| = |P| so that g^{−1}Hg = P.

Theorem (3)—Let q denote the order of any Sylow p-subgroup P of a finite group G. Let n_{p} denote the number of Sylow p-subgroups of G. Then (a) n_{p} = [G : N_{G}(P)] (where N_{G}(P) is the normalizer of P), (b) n_{p} divides |G|/q, and (c) n_{p} ≡ 1 (mod p).

Proof

Let Ω be the set of all Sylow p-subgroups of G and let G act on Ω by conjugation. Let P ∈ Ω be a Sylow p-subgroup. By Theorem 2, the orbit of P has size n_{p}, so by the orbit-stabilizer theorem n_{p} = [G : G_{P}]. For this group action, the stabilizer G_{P} is given by {g ∈ G | gPg^{−1} = P} = N_{G}(P), the normalizer of P in G. Thus, n_{p} = [G : N_{G}(P)], and it follows that this number is a divisor of [G : P] = |G|/q.

Now let P act on Ω by conjugation, and again let Ω_{0} denote the set of fixed points of this action. Let Q ∈ Ω_{0} and observe that then Q = xQx^{−1} for all x ∈ P so that P ≤ N_{G}(Q). By Theorem 2, P and Q are conjugate in N_{G}(Q) in particular, and Q is normal in N_{G}(Q), so then P = Q. It follows that Ω_{0} = {P} so that, by the Lemma, |Ω| ≡ |Ω_{0}| = 1 (mod p).

== Algorithms ==
The problem of finding a Sylow subgroup of a given group is an important problem in computational group theory.

One proof of the existence of Sylow p-subgroups is constructive: if H is a p-subgroup of G and the index [G:H] is divisible by p, then the normalizer N = N_{G}(H) of H in G is also such that [N : H] is divisible by p. In other words, a polycyclic generating system of a Sylow p-subgroup can be found by starting from any p-subgroup H (including the identity) and taking elements of p-power order contained in the normalizer of H but not in H itself. The algorithmic version of this (and many improvements) is described in textbook form in Butler, including the algorithm described in Cannon. These versions are still used in the GAP computer algebra system.

In permutation groups, it has been proven, in Kantor and Kantor and Taylor, that a Sylow p-subgroup and its normalizer can be found in polynomial time of the input (the degree of the group times the number of generators). These algorithms are described in textbook form in Seress, and are now becoming practical as the constructive recognition of finite simple groups becomes a reality. In particular, versions of this algorithm are used in the Magma computer algebra system.

== See also ==
- Frattini's argument
- Hall subgroup
- Maximal subgroup
- McKay conjecture
- p-group
