= Wolfgang Gaschütz =

German mathematician (1920–2016)

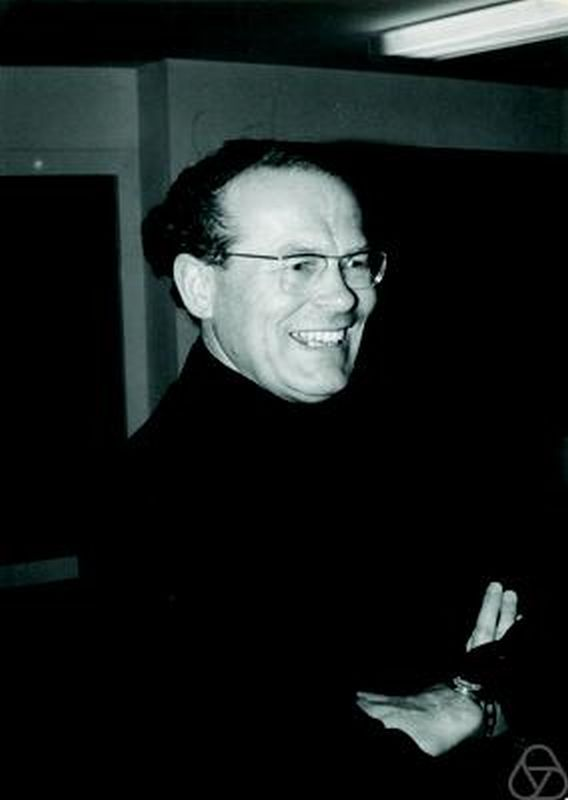
Wolfgang Gaschütz 1973

Wolfgang Gaschütz (11 June 1920 – 7 November 2016) was a German mathematician, known for his research in group theory, especially the theory of finite groups.

== Biography ==
Gaschütz was born on 11 June 1920 in Karlshof, Oderbruch. He moved with his family in 1931 to Berlin, where he completed his Abitur in 1938. He served as an artillery officer in WW II, which ended for him in 1945 near Kiel. There in autumn 1945 he matriculated at the University of Kiel. He was inspired by Andreas Speiser's book Die Theorie der Gruppen von endlicher Ordnung. Gaschütz received his Ph.D. (Promotion) in 1949 under the supervision of Karl-Heinrich Weise with doctoral dissertation entitled (Zur $\Phi$-Untergruppe endlicher Gruppen). In 1953 Gaschütz completed his habilitation in Kiel. At the University of Kiel he held the junior academic appointments Wissenschaftliche Hilfskraft from 1949 to 1956 and Diätendozent from 1956 to 1959. He was Außerplanmäßiger Professor from 1959 to 1962, professor extraordinarius from 1962 to 1964, and professor ordinarius (full professor) from 1964 to 1988. He taught at Kiel until his retirement as professor emeritus in 1988. He rejected calls to Karlsruhe and Mainz. He was a visiting professor at various universities in Europe (Queen Mary College London 1965 and 1970, University of Padua 1966, University of Florence 1971, University of Naples Federico II 1974, University of Warwick 1967, 1973 and 1977); in the USA (Michigan State University 1963, University of Chicago 1968); and in Australia (Australian National University in Canberra).

Gaschütz created a school of group theorists in Kiel, where there had been a gap in mathematical expertise in algebra since the death of Ernst Steinitz in 1928. Gaschütz, influenced by Helmut Wielandt in the 1950s, is best known for his research on Frattini subgroups, on questions of complementability, on group cohomology, and on the theory of finite solvable groups. In 1959 he gave a formula for the Eulerian function introduced in 1936 by Philip Hall and determined the number of generators of a finite solvable group in terms of structure and embedding of the chief factors of the Eulerian function.

In 1962, Gaschütz published his theory of formations, giving a unified theory of Hall subgroups and Carter subgroups. Gaschütz's theory is important for understanding finite solvable groups. He characterized solvable T-groups. He is one of the pioneers of the theory of Fitting classes begun by Bernd Fischer in 1966 and the theory of Schunk classes.

Gaschütz organized the Oberwolfach conferences on group theory for many years with Bertram Huppert and Karl W. Gruenberg. In 2000 Gaschütz received an honorary doctorate from Francisk Skorina Gomel State University in Belarus. His doctoral students include Joachim Neubüser.

Gaschütz and his wife Gudrun were married in 1943 and became the parents of a son and two daughters.

Gaschütz died in Kiel on 7 November 2016, at the age of 96.

== Selected publications ==
- Zur Erweiterungstheorie endlicher Gruppen, Journal für die reine und angewandte Mathematik vol. 190, 1952, pp. 93–107, Online
- Über die $\Phi$-Untergruppe endlicher Gruppen, Mathematische Zeitschrift, vol. 58, 1953, pp. 160–170, Online doi:10.1007/BF01174137
- Fong, P.; Gaschütz, W. (1961). "A note on the modular representations of solvable groups". Journal für die reine und angewandte Mathematik. 208: 73–78. doi:10.1515/crll.1961.208.73. S2CID 118368313.
- Praefrattinigruppen, Archiv der Mathematik, vol. 13, 1962, pp. 418–426. doi:10.1007/BF01650090
- Zur Theorie der endlichen auflösbaren Gruppen, Mathematische Zeitschrift, vol. 80, 1963, pp. 300–305, Online
- "On presentations of finite p-groups". Journal für die reine und angewandte Mathematik. 245: 172–176. 1970. doi:10.1515/crll.1970.245.172. S2CID 117732425.
- Gaschütz, Wolfgang (1971). "Sylowisatoren". Mathematische Zeitschrift. 122 (4): 319–320. doi:10.1007/BF01110166.
- "Subgroup criteria for an abelian group". Journal für die reine und angewandte Mathematik. 295: 214–220. 1977. doi:10.1515/crll.1977.295.214. S2CID 120015921.
- Lectures on subgroups of Sylow type in finite soluble groups, Canberra, Australian National University 1979 LCCN 80-509698 ISBN 0908160224 (pbk.)
