= T-group (mathematics) =

In mathematics, in the field of group theory, a T-group is a group in which the property of normality is transitive, that is, every subnormal subgroup is normal. Here are some facts about T-groups:

- Every simple group is a T-group.
- Every quasisimple group is a T-group.
- Every abelian group is a T-group.
- Every Hamiltonian group is a T-group.
- Every nilpotent T-group is either abelian or Hamiltonian, because in a nilpotent group, every subgroup is subnormal.
- Every normal subgroup of a T-group is a T-group.
- Every homomorphic image of a T-group is a T-group.
- Every solvable T-group is metabelian.

The solvable T-groups were characterized by Wolfgang Gaschütz as being exactly the solvable groups G with an abelian normal Hall subgroup H of odd order such that the quotient group G/H is a Dedekind group and H is acted upon by conjugation as a group of power automorphisms by G.

A PT-group is a group in which permutability is transitive. A finite T-group is a PT-group.
