= List of transitive finite linear groups =

In mathematics, especially in areas of abstract algebra and finite geometry, the list of transitive finite linear groups is an important classification of certain highly symmetric actions of finite groups on vector spaces.

The solvable finite 2-transitive groups were classified by Bertram Huppert. The classification of finite simple groups made possible the complete classification of finite doubly transitive permutation groups. This is a result by Christoph Hering. A finite 2-transitive group has a socle that is either a vector space over a finite field or a non-abelian primitive simple group; groups of the latter kind are almost simple groups and described elsewhere. This article provides a complete list of the finite 2-transitive groups whose socle is elementary abelian.

Let $p$ be a prime, and $G$ a subgroup of the general linear group $GL(d,p)$ acting transitively on the nonzero vectors of the d-dimensional vector space $(F_p)^d$ over the finite field$F_p$ with p elements.

== Infinite classes ==
There are four infinite classes of finite transitive linear groups.

- $G \leq \Gamma{}L(1,p^d);$
- $G \triangleright SL(a,q)\text{ and }p^d=q^a;$
- $G \triangleright Sp(2a,q)\text{ and }p^d=q^{2a};$
- $G \triangleright G_2(q)',\ p^d=q^6\text{ and }p=2.$

Notice that the exceptional group of Lie type G_{2}(q) is usually constructed as the automorphism groups of the split octonions. Hence, it has a natural representation as a subgroup of the 7-dimensional orthogonal group O(7, q). If q is even, then the underlying quadratic form polarizes to a degenerate symplectic form. Factoring out with the radical, one obtains an isomorphism between O(7, q) and the symplectic group Sp(6, q). The subgroup of Sp(6, q) which corresponds to G_{2}(q)′ is transitive.

In fact, for q>2, the group G_{2}(q) = G_{2}(q)′ is simple. If q=2 then G_{2}(2)′ ≅ PSU(3,3) is simple with index 2 in G_{2}(2).

== Sporadic finite transitive linear groups ==
These groups are usually classified by some typical normal subgroup, this normal subgroup is denoted by G_{0} and are written in the third column of the table. The notation 2^{1+4}_{−} stands for the extraspecial group of minus type of order 32 (i.e. the extraspecial group of order 32 with an odd number (namely one) of quaternion factor).

All but one of the sporadic transitive linear groups $G$ yield a primitive permutation group $p^d:G$ of degree at most 2499. In the computer algebra programs GAP and MAGMA, these groups can be accessed with the command PrimitiveGroup(p^d,k); where the number k is the primitive identification of $p^d:G$. This number is given in the last column of the following table.

Seven of these groups are sharply transitive; these groups were found by Hans Zassenhaus and are also known as the multiplicative groups of the Zassenhaus near-fields. These groups are marked by a star in the table.

Condition on $p$	Condition on $d$	$G_0$	Primitive identification of $p^d:G$
$p=5$	$d=2$	$SL(2,3)$	15*, 18, 19
$p=7$	$d=2$	$SL(2,3)$	25*, 29
$p=11$	$d=2$	$SL(2,3)$	39*, 42
$p=23$	$d=2$	$SL(2,3)$	59*
$p=11$	$d=2$	$SL(2,5)$	56*, 57
$p=19$	$d=2$	$SL(2,5)$	86
$p=29$	$d=2$	$SL(2,5)$	106*, 110
$p=59$	$d=2$	$SL(2,5)$	84*
$p=2$	$d=4$	$A_6$	16, 17
$p=2$	$d=4$	$A_7$	20
$p=3$	$d=4$	$SL(2,5)$	124, 126, 127, 128
$p=3$	$d=4$	$2^{1+4}_-$	71, 90, 99, 129, 130
$p=2$	$d=6$	$PSU(3,3)$	62, 63
$p=3$	$d=6$	$SL(2,13)$	396

This list is not explicitly contained in Hering's paper. Many books and papers give a list of these groups, some of them an incomplete one. For example, Cameron's book misses the groups in line 11 of the table, that is, containing $SL(2,5)$ as a normal subgroup.
