= M-group =

In mathematics, especially in the field of group theory, the term M-group may refer to a few distinct concepts:

- monomial group, in character theory, a group whose complex irreducible characters are all monomial
- Iwasawa group or modular group, in the study of subgroup lattices, a group whose subgroup lattice is modular
- virtually polycyclic group, in infinite group theory, a group with a polycyclic subgroup of finite index
