= Szép =

Szép, Szep may refer to:

In people:

- Ernő Szép (1884 – 1953), Jewish Hungarian poet, writer, journalist
- Jason Szep (b. 1969), U.S. journalist
- Jenő Szép (1920 – 2004), Hungarian mathematician and professor
- Paul Szep (b. 1941), Canadian political cartoonist
- Krisztián Szép Kis (b. 1972), Hungarian handball player
- Shawn Szep (b. 1971), American racing driver
- Tamás Szép (b. 1973), Hungarian football player

In other uses:

- Zappa–Szép product, mathematics
- Szép sniper rifle of Hungary
