= Complemented group =

In mathematics, in the realm of group theory, the term complemented group is used in two distinct, but similar ways.

In (Hall 1937), a complemented group is one in which every subgroup has a group-theoretic complement. Such groups are called completely factorizable groups in the Russian literature, following (Baeva 1953) and (Černikov 1953).

The following are equivalent for any finite group G:

- G is complemented
- G is a subgroup of a direct product of groups of square-free order (a special type of Z-group)
- G is a supersolvable group with elementary abelian Sylow subgroups (a special type of A-group), (Hall 1937, Theorem 1 and 2).

Later, in (Zacher 1953), a group is said to be complemented if the lattice of subgroups is a complemented lattice, that is, if for every subgroup H there is a subgroup K such that H ∩ K = 1 and ⟨H, K ⟩ is the whole group. Hall's definition required in addition that H and K permute, that is, that HK = {hk : h in H, k in K} form a subgroup. Such groups are also called K-groups in the Italian and lattice theoretic literature, such as (Schmidt 1994, pp. 114–121, Chapter 3.1). The Frattini subgroup of a K-group is trivial; if a group has a core-free maximal subgroup that is a K-group, then it itself is a K-group; hence subgroups of K-groups need not be K-groups, but quotient groups and direct products of K-groups are K-groups, (Schmidt 1994, pp. 115–116). In (Costantini & Zacher 2004) it is shown that every finite simple group is a complemented group. Note that in the classification of finite simple groups, K-group is more used to mean a group whose proper subgroups only have composition factors amongst the known finite simple groups.

An example of a group that is not complemented (in either sense) is the cyclic group of order p^{2}, where p is a prime number. This group only has one nontrivial subgroup H, the cyclic group of order p, so there can be no other subgroup L to be the complement of H.
