= Complement (group theory) =

In mathematics, especially in the area of algebra known as group theory, a complement of a subgroup H in a group G is a subgroup K of G such that
$$G = HK = \{ hk : h\in H, k\in K\} \text{ and } H\cap K = \{e\}.$$
Equivalently, every element of G has a unique expression as a product hk where h ∈ H and k ∈ K. This relation is symmetrical: if K is a complement of H, then H is a complement of K. Neither H nor K need be a normal subgroup of G.

== Properties ==
- Complements need not exist, and if they do they need not be unique. That is, H could have two distinct complements K_{1} and K_{2} in G.
- If there are several complements of a normal subgroup, then they are necessarily isomorphic to each other and to the quotient group.
- If K is a complement of H in G then K forms both a left and right transversal of H. That is, the elements of K form a complete set of representatives of both the left and right cosets of H.
- The Schur–Zassenhaus theorem guarantees the existence of complements of normal Hall subgroups of finite groups.

== Relation to other products ==
Complements generalize both the direct product (where the subgroups H and K are normal in G), and the semidirect product (where one of H or K is normal in G). The product corresponding to a general complement is called the internal Zappa–Szép product. When H and K are nontrivial, complement subgroups factor a group into smaller pieces.

== Existence ==
As previously mentioned, complements need not exist.

A p-complement is a complement to a Sylow p-subgroup. Theorems of Frobenius and Thompson describe when a group has a normal p-complement. Philip Hall characterized finite soluble groups amongst finite groups as those with p-complements for every prime p; these p-complements are used to form what is called a Sylow system.

A Frobenius complement is a special type of complement in a Frobenius group.

A complemented group is one where every subgroup has a complement.

== See also ==
- Product of group subsets
