= Taunt (surname) =

Taunt is a surname in the English language.

== People ==
- Derek Taunt, British mathematician (1917–2004)
- Henry Taunt, British photographer (1842–1922)
- Angela Verren–Taunt, British artist (1930–2023)

== In fiction ==
- Heidi and Hedy Taunt, CIA agents in the 2000 James Bond novel DoubleShot
