= IA automorphism =

In mathematics, in the realm of group theory, an IA automorphism of a group is an automorphism that acts as identity on the abelianization. The abelianization of a group is its quotient by its commutator subgroup. An IA automorphism is thus an automorphism that sends each coset of the commutator subgroup to itself.

The IA automorphisms of a group form a normal subgroup of the automorphism group. Every inner automorphism is an IA automorphism, since inner automorphisms act trivially on the abelianization and the group of inner automorphisms is normal in the full automorphism group of any group.

For free groups, the study of IA automorphisms is important in understanding the structure of the automorphism group and its subgroups, as these automorphisms often preserve significant algebraic properties of the group. These automorphisms are particularly studied in relation to the lower central series and the behavior of commutator subgroups, providing insight into the intrinsic symmetries of free groups.

== See also ==
- Torelli group
