= Jenő Szép =

Hungarian mathematician

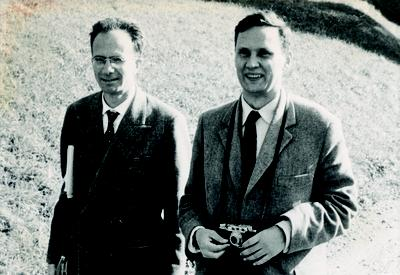
- Jenő Szép (right) and Guido Zappa (left)
- Born: 13 January 1920; Budapest
- Died: 18 October 2004 (aged 84); Budapest
- Citizenship: Hungarian
- Known for: Group theory; Game theory
- Spouse: Tésy Gabriella (1948–2004)
- Scientific career
- Workplaces: Corvinus University of Budapest

Jenő Szép (13 January 1920 – 18 October 2004) was a Hungarian mathematician and professor at the University of Economics, Budapest (now Corvinus University). His main research interests were group theory and game theory. He was a founder of the journal Pure Mathematics and Applications (PUMA).

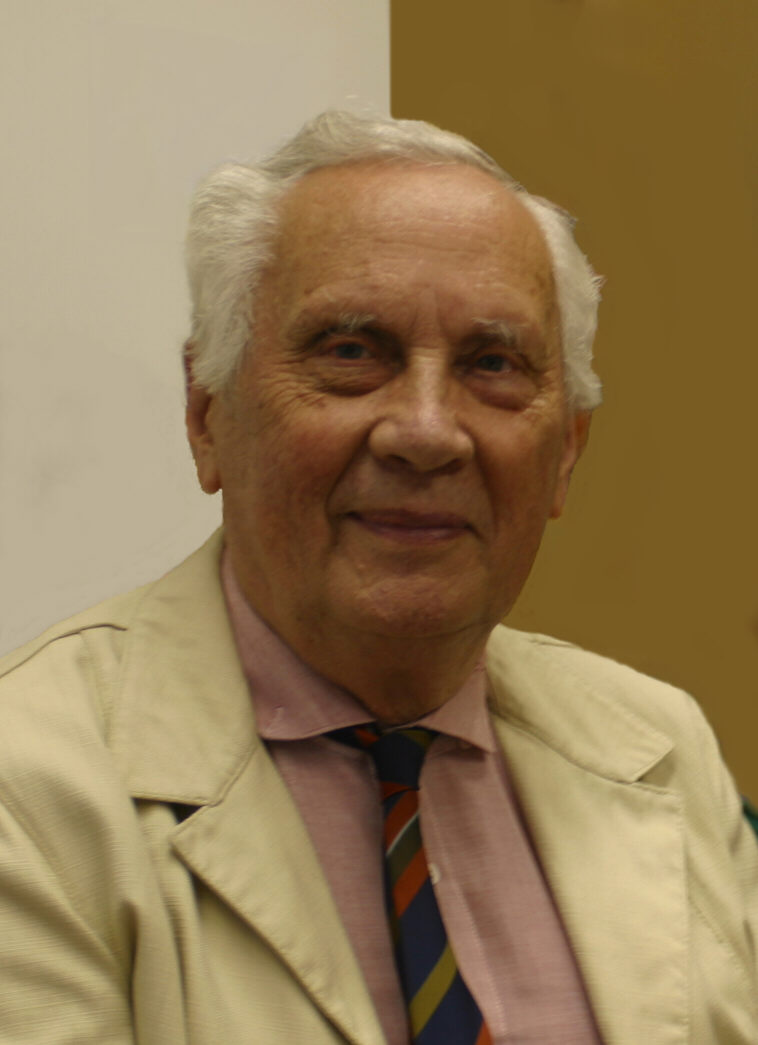
Jenő Szép

The Zappa–Szép product in group theory is named after him and Guido Zappa.

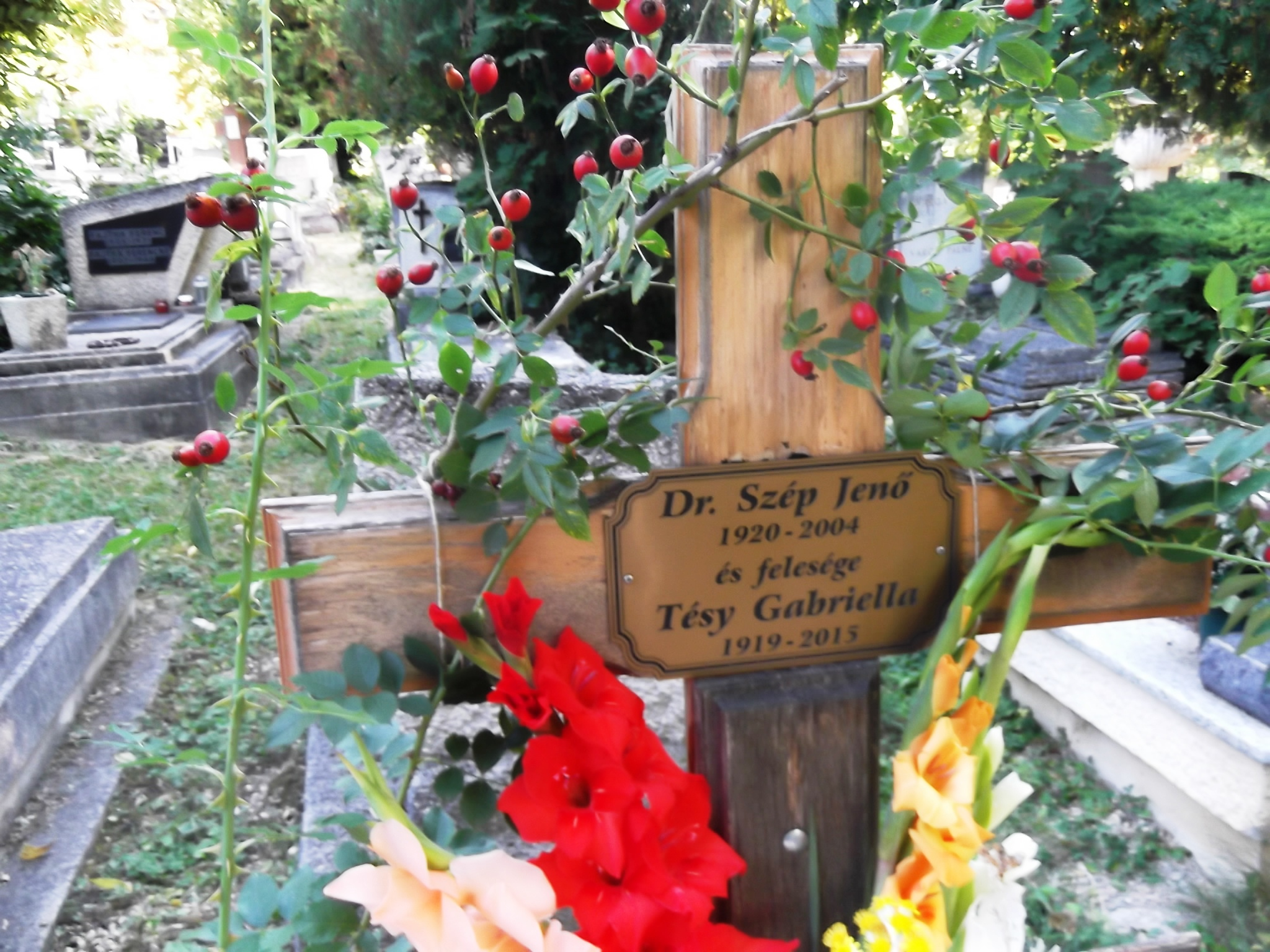
The tomb of Jenő Szép (1920–2004) and his wife, Gabriella Tésy (1919–2015) in Farkasréti Cemetery (plot 11/1, row #1, place #80)

== Biography ==
Jenő Szép's parents were Pál Szép and Arabella Liebert. His wife Gabriella Tésy (1919–2015) was also a mathematician. They had four children: Gabriella (1948), Katalin (1950), Zsófia (1952), and Jenő (1957).

Szép graduated from Miklós Zrínyi Real High School in Budapest in 1938. He later attended Pázmány Péter University and obtained a teacher's diploma in mathematics and physics in 1943, as well as a doctorate in humanities in 1946. He was an intern (1941–1943) and assistant professor (1943–1946) at the Pázmány Péter University Institute of Mathematics, alongside Lipót Fejér and Béla Kerékjártó. He also taught at the Budapest Civic School Teacher Training College (1946–1949).

In 1952, Szép was awarded the Candidate of Mathematical Sciences for his advanced activities and he received his doctorate in 1957 from the Hungarian Academy of Sciences. From 1949 to 1961, he was the head of the Department of Mathematics at the Szeged Teacher Training College.

In February 1961, Szép joined the Department of Mathematics at Corvinus University of Budapest (then the Karl Marx University of Economics). He worked as head of the department from then until 1987 and under his leadership the department became an internationally acknowledged research institute. He was appointed as director of the Institute of Mathematics and Computer Science in 1976 and stayed in this position until his departure in 1987.

In 1990, Szép founded the international scientific journal Pure Mathematics and Applications (PUMA) with professor Franco Migliorini of Università degli Studi di Siena. He was the editor-in-chief of the journal and worked on 14 volumes before his death.

After Szép's retirement in 1993, he continued doing research until his death in 2004. Since 1995, he was both a professor emeritus at the Corvinus University and master emeritus at the University of Szeged.

In honor of his scientific activity, Szép was recognized by the Hungarian Academy of Sciences, universities, and the government. He was awarded the József Eötvös Wreath and the title Laureatus Academiae in 1999.

== Research activities ==
As a mathematician, Szép's main research interests were algebraic structures and group theory. His most cited work concerns the Zappa-Szép product. As a professor at the University of Economics, he had a focus on game theory and, more generally, on application of mathematics to economics.

He was a visiting professor, teaching and researching for several months at Italian and Canadian universities (Rome 1961–62, Florence 1968 and 1972, Padua 1968–69, Western Ontario 1987, Salento 1988–89, and Siena 1990–2002). He lectured, taught, and published in four languages (Hungarian, English, German, and Italian).

Several of his former students work as mathematicians in Hungary and abroad, primarily in Italy and the US.

Starting in 2000, Szép was the editor of the series Advances in Mathematics at Kluwer Academic Publishers and later at Springer, altogether editing 10 volumes.

=== Algebraic structures, group theory ===
Szép's main contributions were to the early stages of group theory. He published papers regarding the factorization of finite groups, solvability conditions, and nilpotent groups. One of his most known results is the Zappa–Szép product, which was discovered independently by Szép and the Italian mathematician Zappa Guido. They published joint papers later.

He notably collaborated with Rédei László, Noboru Itô, Franco Migliorini, and Helmut Jürgensen.

His attention later turned to semigroups, publishing papers on the decomposition of semigroups and on congruence relations of regular semigroups. His book with Jürgensen and Migliorini, Semigroups, was published in 1991.

His conjecture on factorizable groups was published in 1963 and proved in 1987 by Elsa Fisman and Zvi Arad.

=== Game theory ===
Szép developed a generalization and refinement of the Nash equilibrium. These results were not published in international journals but were included in his books. He introduced the concepts of group equilibrium and neighborhoods in the strategy sets; furthermore, he included the costs of changing strategies in equilibrium models.

In 1974, he published his first book on game theory, Bevezetés a játékelméletbe, with Ferenc Forgó. It was published in German (as Einführung in die Spieltheorie) in 1983 and in English (as Introduction to the Theory of Games) in 1985. A rewritten and extended version of the book was published in 1999. These books are used as textbooks in several universities, both in Hungary and internationally.

=== Coding theory ===
In the 1998 book Vectorproducts and Applications, Szép presented a new approach to system theory that contained a summary of his results from research between 1990 and 1995 as well as the applications of multiplicative structures in coding theory, game theory, and distribution vectors.

=== Teaching and research at the Corvinus University of Budapest ===
The ideological barriers against applied mathematics in Hungary started to soften in the 1960s. Beginning in 1961 as head of the Department of Mathematics at Corvinus University of Budapest, Szép had a pioneering role in developing a new curriculum to instruct students in the applications of mathematical methods to economics. His original partners at the university were Béla Krekó and György Meszéna and he was later joined by graduate students with mathematical economics specialisations. The first such student to join was Ferenc Forgó.

In the 1964–65 academic year, Szép designed and delivered the first course on game theory in Hungary.

The results of his systematic research work in pure and applied mathematics were published in English by the department. About 100 issues were published between 1969 and 1988, most of which were referred to by Mathematical Reviews.

Beginning in 1977, Jenő Szép served as director of the newly organised Institute of Mathematics and Computer Science. The department and institute created textbooks and case studies alongside a series of mathematical handbooks. Most of the material was among the first mathematical works for economists in Hungarian.

== Legacy ==
The University of Siena Department of Information Engineering and Mathematics organized a symposium in honor of Jenő Szép in February 2005, a few months after his death. The presentations of this event were published in PUMA 2005, Volume 16.

The Department of Mathematics and Operation Research at Corvinus University named a room in the Sóház Building in his honour on June 4, 2008.

The Hungarian National Memorial and Commemorative Committee declared the resting place of Jenő Szép part of the national cemetery. The inclusion is an expression of the Hungarian nation's appreciation, respect, and gratitude and also provides legal protection to prevent the grave from being dismantled.

== Notable works ==
Szép published around 180 works; Mathematical Reviews referred to 95 of his publications. Zentralblatt für Mathematik indexed 95 of his works.

- On Finite Groups Which Are Necessarily Commutative
- Über die als Produkt zweier Untergruppen darstellbaren endlicher Gruppen
- On Simple Groups
- Über die endlichen nilpotenten Gruppen
- On the structure of groups which can be represented as the product of two subgroups
- Zur Theorie der endlichen einfachen Gruppen
- Eine Verallgemeinerung der Remakschen Zerlegung
- Zur Theorie der faktorisierbaren Gruppen
- Über die Faktorisation von Gruppen
- Zur Theorie der Halbgruppen
- Analízis: Matematikai ismeretek gazdasági szakemberek számára
- Sui gruppi fattorizzabili
- Introduction to the Theory of Games
- On a finite algebra with two operations
- On a Special Decomposition of Regular Semigroups
- Semigroups
- Vectorproducts and Applications
- Introduction to the Theory of Games: Concepts, Methods, Applications
