= Hypoabelian group =

Hypoabelian group or Hypoabelian may refer to:

- "Hypoabelian group", an archaic name for an orthogonal group over a field of characteristic 2
- A hypoabelian group, a group whose perfect core is trivial
