= T-group =

T-group may refer to:

- T-group (mathematics), a mathematical structure
- T-group (social psychology), a group of people learning about human behaviour by interacting with each other
