= Schur–Zassenhaus theorem =

Theorem in group theory

The Schur–Zassenhaus theorem is a theorem in group theory which states that if $G$ is a finite group, and $N$ is a normal subgroup whose order is coprime to the order of the quotient group $G/N$, then $G$ is a semidirect product (or split extension) of $N$ and $G/N$. An alternative statement of the theorem is that any normal Hall subgroup $N$ of a finite group $G$ has a complement in $G$. Moreover if either $N$ or $G/N$ is solvable then the Schur–Zassenhaus theorem also states that all complements of $N$ in $G$ are conjugate. The assumption that either $N$ or $G/N$ is solvable can be dropped as it is always satisfied, but all known proofs of this require the use of the much harder Feit–Thompson theorem.

The Schur–Zassenhaus theorem at least partially answers the question: "In a composition series, how can we classify groups with a certain set of composition factors?" The other part, which is where the composition factors do not have coprime orders, is tackled in extension theory.

== History ==
The Schur–Zassenhaus theorem was introduced by Zassenhaus (1937, 1958, Chapter IV, section 7). Theorem 25, which he credits to Issai Schur, proves the existence of a complement, and theorem 27 proves that all complements are conjugate under the assumption that $N$ or $G/N$ is solvable. It is not easy to find an explicit statement of the existence of a complement in Schur's published works, though the results of Schur (1904, 1907) on the Schur multiplier imply the existence of a complement in the special case when the normal subgroup is in the center. Zassenhaus pointed out that the Schur–Zassenhaus theorem for non-solvable groups would follow if all groups of odd order are solvable, which was later proved by Feit and Thompson. Ernst Witt showed that it would also follow from the Schreier conjecture (see Witt (1998, p.277) for Witt's unpublished 1937 note about this), but the Schreier conjecture has only been proved using the classification of finite simple groups, which is far harder than the Feit–Thompson theorem.

== Examples ==
If we do not impose the coprime condition, the theorem is not true: consider for example the cyclic group $C_4$ and its normal subgroup $C_2$. Then if $C_4$ were a semidirect product of $C_2$ and $C_4 / C_2 \cong C_2$ then $C_4$ would have to contain two elements of order 2, but it only contains one. Another way to explain this impossibility of splitting $C_4$ (i.e. expressing it as a semidirect product) is to observe that the automorphisms of $C_2$ are the trivial group, so the only possible [semi]direct product of $C_2$ with itself is a direct product (which gives rise to the Klein four-group, a group that is non-isomorphic with $C_4$).

An example where the Schur–Zassenhaus theorem does apply is the symmetric group on 3 symbols, $S_3$, which has a normal subgroup of order 3 (isomorphic with $C_3$) which in turn has index 2 in $S_3$ (in agreement with the theorem of Lagrange), so $S_3 / C_3 \cong C_2$. Since 2 and 3 are relatively prime, the Schur–Zassenhaus theorem applies and $S_3 \cong C_3 \rtimes C_2$. Note that the automorphism group of $C_3$ is $C_2$ and the automorphism of $C_3$ used in the semidirect product that gives rise to $S_3$ is the non-trivial automorphism that permutes the two non-identity elements of $C_3$. Furthermore, the three subgroups of order 2 in $S_3$ (any of which can serve as a complement to $C_3$ in $S_3$) are conjugate to each other.

The non-triviality of the (additional) conjugacy conclusion can be illustrated with the Klein four-group $V$ as the non-example. Any of the three proper subgroups of $V$ (all of which have order 2) is normal in $V$; fixing one of these subgroups, any of the other two remaining (proper) subgroups complements it in $V$, but none of these three subgroups of $V$ is a conjugate of any other one, because $V$ is abelian.

The quaternion group has normal subgroups of order 4 and 2 but is not a [semi]direct product. Schur's papers at the beginning of the 20th century introduced the notion of central extension to address examples such as $C_4$ and the quaternions.

== Proof ==
The existence of a complement to a normal Hall subgroup H of a finite group G can be proved in the following steps:

1. By induction on the order of G, we can assume that it is true for any smaller group.
2. If H is abelian, then the existence of a complement follows from the fact that the cohomology group H^{2}(G/H,H) vanishes (as H and G/H have coprime orders) and the fact that all complements are conjugate follows from the vanishing of H^{1}(G/H,H).
3. If H is solvable, it has a nontrivial abelian subgroup A that is characteristic in H and therefore normal in G. Applying the Schur–Zassenhaus theorem to G/A reduces the proof to the case when H=A is abelian which has been done in the previous step.
4. If the normalizer N=N_{G}(P) of every p-Sylow subgroup P of H is equal to G, then H is nilpotent, and in particular solvable, so the theorem follows by the previous step.
5. If the normalizer N=N_{G}(P) of some p-Sylow subgroup P of H is smaller than G, then by induction the Schur–Zassenhaus theorem holds for N, and a complement of N∩H in N is a complement for H in G because G=NH.
