= Bicrossed product of Hopf algebra =

Concept in Hopf algebra

In quantum group and Hopf algebra, the bicrossed product is a process to create new Hopf algebras from the given ones. It's motivated by the Zappa–Szép product of groups. It was first discussed by M. Takeuchi in 1981, and now a general tool for construction of Drinfeld quantum double.

== Bicrossed product ==
Consider two bialgebras $A$ and $X$. If there exist linear maps $\alpha:A\otimes X \to X$ turning $X$ a module coalgebra over $A$ and $\beta: A\otimes X\to A$ turning $A$ into a right module coalgebra over $X$, we call them a pair of matched bialgebras. If we set $\alpha(a\otimes x)=a\cdot x$ and $\beta(a\otimes x)=a^x$, the following conditions are satisfied

$a\cdot (xy)=\sum_{(a),(x)}(a_{(1)} \cdot x_{(1)}) (a_{(2)}^{x_{(2)}} \cdot y)$

$a\cdot 1_X=\varepsilon_A(a)1_X$

$(ab)^x=\sum_{(b),(x)}a^{b_{(1)} \cdot x_{(1)}} b_{(2)}^{x_{(2)}}$

$1_A^x=\varepsilon_X(x)1_A$

$\sum_{(a),(x)}a_{(1)}^{x_{(1)}} \otimes a_{(2)}\cdot x_{(2)}=\sum_{(a),(x)}a_{(2)}^{x_{(2)}}\otimes a_{(1)}\cdot x_{(1)}$

for all $a,b\in A$ and $x,y\in X$. Here the Sweedler's notation of coproduct of Hopf algebra is used.

For matched pair of Hopf algebras $A$ and $X$, there exists a unique Hopf algebra over $X\otimes A$, the resulting Hopf algebra is called bicrossed product of $A$ and $X$ and denoted by $X \bowtie A$,

- The unit is given by $(1_X\otimes 1_A)$;
- The multiplication is given by $(x\otimes a)(y\otimes b)=\sum_{(a),(y)}x(a_{(1)}\cdot y_{(1)}) \otimes a_{(2)}^{y_{(2)}} b$;
- The counit is $\varepsilon(x\otimes a)=\varepsilon_X(x)\varepsilon_A(a)$;
- The coproduct is $\Delta(x\otimes a)=\sum_{(x),(a)} (x_{(1)}\otimes a_{(1)}) \otimes (x_{(2)}\otimes a_{(2)})$;
- The antipode is $S(x\otimes a)=\sum_{(x),(a)}S(a_{(2)})\cdot S(x_{(2)}) \otimes S(a_{(1)})^{S(x_{(1)})}$.

== Drinfeld quantum double ==
For a given Hopf algebra $H$, its dual space $H^*$ has a canonical Hopf algebra structure and $H$ and $H^{*cop}$ are matched pairs. In this case, the bicrossed product of them is called Drinfeld quantum double $D(H)=H^{*cop}\bowtie H$.
