= K-group =

K-group or K group may refer to:

- A group in algebraic K-theory
- A group in topological K-theory
- A complemented group
- K-Groups (Germany), small Communist groups in 1970s Germany
