= Metabelian group =

Mathematical group whose commutator subgroup is abelian

In mathematics, a metabelian group is a group whose commutator subgroup is abelian. Equivalently, a group G is metabelian if and only if there is an abelian normal subgroup A such that the quotient group G/A is abelian.

Subgroups of metabelian groups are metabelian, as are images of metabelian groups.

Metabelian groups are solvable. In fact, they are precisely the solvable groups of derived length at most 2.

== Examples ==
- Any abelian group is metabelian.
- Any dihedral group is metabelian, as it has a cyclic normal subgroup of index 2. More generally, any generalized dihedral group is metabelian, as it has an abelian normal subgroup of index 2.
- Any metacyclic group is metabelian.
- If F is a field, the group Aff(F) of affine maps $x \mapsto ax+b$ (where $a\neq 0$) acting on F is metabelian. Here the abelian normal subgroup is the group of pure translations $x\mapsto x+b$, and the abelian quotient group is isomorphic to the group of homotheties $x\mapsto ax$. If F is a finite field with $q$ elements, this metabelian group is of order $q(q-1)$.
- The group of direct isometries of the Euclidean plane is metabelian. This is similar to the above example, as the elements are again affine maps. The translations of the plane form an abelian normal subgroup of the group, and the corresponding quotient is the circle group.
- The finite Heisenberg group H_{3,p} of order p^{3} is metabelian. The same is true for any Heisenberg group defined over a ring (group of upper-triangular 3 × 3 matrices with entries in a commutative ring).
- All nilpotent groups of class 3 or less are metabelian.
- The lamplighter group is metabelian.
- All groups of order p^{5} are metabelian (for prime p).
- All groups G with abelian subgroups A and B such that G=AB are metabelian.
- All groups of order less than 24 are metabelian.

In contrast to this last example, the symmetric group S_{4} of order 24 is not metabelian, as its commutator subgroup is the non-abelian alternating group A_{4}.
