= Z-group =

In mathematics, especially in the area of algebra known as group theory, the term Z-group refers to a number of distinct types of groups:

- in the study of finite groups, a Z-group is a finite group whose Sylow subgroups are all cyclic.
- in the study of infinite groups, a Z-group is a group which possesses a very general form of central series.
- in the study of ordered groups, a Z-group or $\mathbb Z$-group is a discretely ordered abelian group whose quotient over its minimal convex subgroup is divisible. Such groups are elementarily equivalent to the integers $(\mathbb Z,+,<)$. Z-groups are an alternative presentation of Presburger arithmetic.
- occasionally, (Z)-group is used to mean a Zassenhaus group, a special type of permutation group.

== Groups whose Sylow subgroups are cyclic ==
Usage: (Suzuki 1955), (Bender & Glauberman 1994, p. 2), MR0409648, (Wonenburger 1976), (Çelik 1976)

In the study of finite groups, a Z-group is a finite group whose Sylow subgroups are all cyclic. The Z originates both from the German Zyklische and from their classification in (Zassenhaus 1935). In many standard textbooks these groups have no special name, other than metacyclic groups, but that term is often used more generally today. See metacyclic group for more on the general, modern definition which includes non-cyclic p-groups; see (Hall 1959, Th. 9.4.3) for the stricter, classical definition more closely related to Z-groups.

Every group whose Sylow subgroups are cyclic is itself metacyclic, so supersolvable. In fact, such a group has a cyclic derived subgroup with cyclic maximal abelian quotient. Such a group has the presentation (Hall 1959, Th. 9.4.3):

$G(m,n,r) = \langle a,b | a^m = b^n = 1, bab^{-1} = a^r \rangle$, where mn is the order of G(m,n,r), the greatest common divisor, gcd((r-1)n, m) = 1, and r^{n} ≡ 1 (mod m).

The character theory of Z-groups is well understood (Çelik 1976), as they are monomial groups.

The derived length of a Z-group is at most 2, so Z-groups may be insufficient for some uses. A generalization due to Hall are the A-groups, those groups with abelian Sylow subgroups. These groups behave similarly to Z-groups, but can have arbitrarily large derived length (Hall 1940). Another generalization due to (Suzuki 1955) allows the Sylow 2-subgroup more flexibility, including dihedral and generalized quaternion groups.

== Group with a generalized central series ==
Usage: (Robinson 1996), (Kurosh 1960)

The definition of central series used for Z-group is somewhat technical. A series of G is a collection S of subgroups of G, linearly ordered by inclusion, such that for every g in G, the subgroups A_{g} = ∩ { N in S : g in N } and B_{g} = ∪ { N in S : g not in N } are both in S. A (generalized) central series of G is a series such that every N in S is normal in G and such that for every g in G, the quotient A_{g}/B_{g} is contained in the center of G/B_{g}. A Z-group is a group with such a (generalized) central series. Examples include the hypercentral groups whose transfinite upper central series form such a central series, as well as the hypocentral groups whose transfinite lower central series form such a central series (Robinson 1996).

== Special 2-transitive groups ==
Usage: (Suzuki 1961)

A (Z)-group is a group faithfully represented as a doubly transitive permutation group in which no non-identity element fixes more than two points. A (ZT)-group is a (Z)-group that is of odd degree and not a Frobenius group, that is a Zassenhaus group of odd degree, also known as one of the groups PSL(2,2^{k+1}) or Sz(2^{2k+1}), for k any positive integer (Suzuki 1961).
