= Hall's theorem =

In mathematics, Hall's theorem may refer to:

- Hall's marriage theorem
- One of several theorems about Hall subgroups
