= Chief series =

In abstract algebra, a chief series is a maximal normal series for a group.

It is similar to a composition series, though the two concepts are distinct in general: a chief series is a maximal normal series, while a composition series is a maximal subnormal series.

Chief series can be thought of as breaking the group down into less complicated pieces, which may be used to characterize various qualities of the group.

== Definition ==
A chief series is a maximal normal series for a group. Equivalently, a chief series is a composition series of the group G under the action of inner automorphisms.

In detail, if G is a group, then a chief series of G is a finite collection of normal subgroups N_{i} ⊆ G,

$$1=N_0\subseteq N_1\subseteq N_2\subseteq\cdots\subseteq N_n=G,$$

such that each quotient group N_{i+1}/N_{i}, for i = 1, 2,..., n − 1, is a minimal normal subgroup of G/N_{i}. Equivalently, there does not exist any subgroup A normal in G such that N_{i} < A < N_{i+1} for any i. In other words, a chief series may be thought of as "full" in the sense that no normal subgroup of G may be added to it.

The factor groups N_{i+1}/N_{i} in a chief series are called the chief factors of the series. Unlike composition factors, chief factors are not necessarily simple. That is, there may exist a subgroup A normal in N_{i+1} with N_{i} < A < N_{i+1}, but A is not normal in G. However, the chief factors are always characteristically simple, that is, they have no proper nontrivial characteristic subgroups. In particular, a finite chief factor is a direct product of isomorphic simple groups.

== Properties ==
=== Existence ===
Finite groups always have a chief series, though infinite groups need not have a chief series. For example, the group of integers Z with addition as the operation does not have a chief series. To see this, note Z is cyclic and abelian, and so all of its subgroups are normal and cyclic as well. Supposing there exists a chief series N_{i} leads to an immediate contradiction: N_{1} is cyclic and thus is generated by some integer a, however the subgroup generated by 2a is a nontrivial normal subgroup properly contained in N_{1}, contradicting the definition of a chief series.

=== Uniqueness ===
When a chief series for a group exists, it is generally not unique. However, a form of the Jordan–Hölder theorem states that the chief factors of a group are unique up to isomorphism, independent of the particular chief series they are constructed from In particular, the number of chief factors is an invariant of the group G, as well as the isomorphism classes of the chief factors and their multiplicities.

=== Other properties ===
In abelian groups, chief series and composition series are identical, as all subgroups are normal.

Given any normal subgroup N ⊆ G, one can always find a chief series in which N is one of the elements (assuming a chief series for G exists in the first place.) Also, if G has a chief series and N is normal in G, then both N and G/N have chief series. The converse also holds: if N is normal in G and both N and G/N have chief series, G has a chief series as well.
