= Critical group =

In mathematics, in the realm of group theory, a group is said to be critical if it is not in the variety generated by all its proper subquotients, which includes all its subgroups and all its quotients.

== Definition ==
A factor of a group $G$ is a group of the form $H/N$, where $H$ is a subgroup of $G$, and $N$ is a normal subgroup of $G$, and is called a proper factor when $N$ is non-trivial or $H$ is a proper subgroup. A group $G$ is critical when it is finite as well as not within the variety generated by the group's proper factors. Critical groups were introduced by D. C. Cross

=== Examples and non-examples ===
Every finite simple group is critical. On the other hand, if a group is generated by a subgroup with multiple normal subgroups of that group, but not generated from any proper subset of those normal subgroups with the subgroup, and if the commutator subgroup generated by the normal subgroups is trivial for every permutation involved in generating the commutator subgroup, then the group is not critical.

== Properties ==
Every critical group $G$ has a unique minimal normal subgroup called the monolith, and this subgroup is denoted $\sigma G$. Such groups are called monolithic, which are a necessary yet insufficient condition for being critical.

- Any finite monolithic A-group is critical. This result is due to Kovacs and Newman. But not every monolithic group is critical.
- The variety generated by a finite group has a finite number of nonisomorphic critical groups.

== Cross variety ==
A Cross variety is a variety of groups that satisfies:

- The variety "has a finite basis for its identical relations"
- All finitely generated groups in the variety are necessarily finite.
- There are only a finite amount of critical groups in the variety.

Sheila Oates and M.B.Powell proved using Cross varieties that every finite group has a finite basis for the identical relations holding in the group. They also proved that "[a] variety of groups is Cross if and only if it is generated by a finite group," which can be shown inductively from the fact that any variety generated by a Cross variety and a finite group is also a Cross variety.
