= Multiply transitive group action =

Concept in group theory

A group $G$ acts 2-transitively on a set $S$ if it acts transitively on the set of distinct ordered pairs $\{ (x,y) \in S \times S : x \neq y \}$. That is, assuming (without a real loss of generality) that $G$ acts on the left of $S$, for each pair of pairs $(x,y),(w,z)\in S\times S$ with $x \neq y$ and $w\neq z$, there exists a $g\in G$ such that $g(x,y) = (w,z)$.

The group action is sharply 2-transitive if such $g\in G$ is unique.

A 2-transitive group is a group such that there exists a group action that's 2-transitive and faithful. Similarly we can define sharply 2-transitive group.

Equivalently, $gx = w$ and $gy = z$, since the induced action on the distinct set of pairs is $g(x,y) = (gx,gy)$.

The definition works in general with k replacing 2. Such multiply transitive permutation groups can be defined for any natural number k. Specifically, a permutation group G acting on n points is k-transitive if, given two sets of points a_{1}, ... a_{k} and b_{1}, ... b_{k} with the property that all the a_{i} are distinct and all the b_{i} are distinct, there is a group element g in G which maps a_{i} to b_{i} for each i between 1 and k. The Mathieu groups are important examples.

== Examples ==
Every group is trivially sharply 1-transitive, by its action on itself by left-multiplication.

Let $S_n$ be the symmetric group acting on $\{1, ..., n\}$, then the action is sharply n-transitive.

The group of n-dimensional similarities acts 2-transitively on $\mathbb{R}^n$. In the case $n=1$ this action is sharply 2-transitive, but for $n>1$ it is not.

The group of n-dimensional projective transforms almost acts sharply (n+2)-transitively on the n-dimensional real projective space $\mathbb{RP}^n$. The almost is because the (n+2) points must be in general linear position. In other words, the n-dimensional projective transforms act transitively on the space of projective frames of $\mathbb{RP}^n$.

== Classifications of 2-transitive groups ==
Every 2-transitive group is a primitive group, but not conversely. Every Zassenhaus group is 2-transitive, but not conversely. The solvable 2-transitive groups were classified by Bertram Huppert and are described in the list of transitive finite linear groups. The insoluble groups were classified by (Hering 1985) using the classification of finite simple groups and are all almost simple groups.

== See also ==
- Multiply transitive group
