= Metacyclic group =

Extension of a cyclic group by a cyclic group

In group theory, a metacyclic group is an extension of a cyclic group by a cyclic group. Equivalently, a metacyclic group is a group $G$ having a cyclic normal subgroup $N$, such that the quotient $G/N$ is also cyclic.

Metacyclic groups are metabelian and supersolvable. In particular, they are solvable.

== Definition ==
A group $G$ is metacyclic if it has a normal subgroup $N$ such that $N$ and $G/N$ are both cyclic.

In some older books, an inequivalent definition is used: a group $G$ is metacyclic if the commutator subgroup $[G,G]$ and $G/[G,G]$ are both cyclic. This is a strictly stronger property than the one used in this article: for example, the quaternion group is not metacyclic by this definition.

== Examples ==
- Any cyclic group is metacyclic.
- The direct product or semidirect product of two cyclic groups is metacyclic. These include the dihedral groups and the quasidihedral groups.
- The dicyclic groups are metacyclic. (Note that a dicyclic group is not necessarily a semidirect product of two cyclic groups.)
- Every finite group of squarefree order is metacyclic.
- More generally every Z-group is metacyclic. A Z-group is a finite group whose Sylow subgroups are cyclic.
