= Normal automorphism =

In mathematics, in the realm of group theory, a normal automorphism of a group is an automorphism that takes every normal subgroup bijectively to itself. As a result, it gives a corresponding automorphism for every quotient group.

All family automorphisms are normal, and particularly, all class automorphisms and power automorphisms are. As well, all inner automorphisms are normal (but not vice versa), and more generally, any automorphism defined by an algebraic formula is normal.
