= Stability group =

Concept in group theory

In mathematics, specifically group theory, the stability group of a subnormal series is the group of automorphisms that act as the identity on each quotient group.
