= A-group =

In mathematics, in the area of abstract algebra known as group theory, an A-group is a type of group that is similar to abelian groups. The groups were first studied in the 1940s by Philip Hall, and are still studied today. A great deal is known about their structure.

== Definition ==
An A-group is a finite group with the property that all of its Sylow subgroups are abelian.

== History ==
The term A-group was probably first used by Philip Hall in 1940, where attention was restricted to soluble A-groups. Hall's presentation was rather brief without proofs, but his remarks were soon expanded with proofs by D. R. Taunt. The representation theory of A-groups was studied by Noboru Itô. Roger W. Carter then published an important relationship between Carter subgroups and Hall's work. The work of Hall, Taunt, and Carter was presented in textbook form in 1967. The focus on soluble A-groups broadened, with the classification of finite simple A-groups in 1969 which allowed generalizing Taunt's work to finite groups in 1971. Interest in A-groups also broadened due to an important relationship to varieties of groups. Modern interest in A-groups was renewed when new enumeration techniques enabled tight asymptotic bounds on the number of distinct isomorphism classes of A-groups.

== Properties ==
The following can be said about A-groups:

- Every subgroup, quotient group, and direct product of A-groups are A-groups.
- Every finite abelian group is an A-group.
- A finite nilpotent group is an A-group if and only if it is abelian.
- The symmetric group on three points is an A-group that is not abelian.
- Every group of cube-free order is an A-group.
- The derived length of an A-group can be arbitrarily large, but no larger than the number of distinct prime divisors of the order.
- The lower nilpotent series coincides with the derived series.
- A soluble A-group has a unique maximal abelian normal subgroup.
- The Fitting subgroup of a solvable A-group is equal to the direct product of the centers of the terms of the derived series, first stated by Hall, then proven by Taunt.
- A non-abelian finite simple group is an A-group if and only if it is isomorphic to the first Janko group or to PSL(2,q) where q > 3 and either q = 2^{n} or q ≡ 3,5 mod 8.
- All the groups in the variety generated by a finite group are finitely approximable if and only if that group is an A-group.
- Like Z-groups, whose Sylow subgroups are cyclic, A-groups can be easier to study than general finite groups because of the restrictions on the local structure. For instance, a more precise enumeration of soluble A-groups was found after an enumeration of soluble groups with fixed, but arbitrary Sylow subgroups.
