= Supersolvable group =

Group with series of normal subgroups where all factors are cyclic

In mathematics, a group is supersolvable (or supersoluble) if it has an invariant normal series where all the factors are cyclic groups. Supersolvability is stronger than the notion of solvability.

== Definition ==
Let G be a group. G is supersolvable if there exists a normal series

$$\{1\} = H_0 \triangleleft H_1 \triangleleft \cdots \triangleleft H_{s-1} \triangleleft H_s = G$$

such that each quotient group $H_{i+1}/H_i \;$ is cyclic and each $H_i$ is normal in $G$.

By contrast, for a solvable group the definition requires each quotient to be abelian. In another direction, a polycyclic group must have a subnormal series with each quotient cyclic, but there is no requirement that each $H_i$ be normal in $G$. As every finite solvable group is polycyclic, this can be seen as one of the key differences between the definitions. For a concrete example, the alternating group on four points, $A_4$, is solvable but not supersolvable.

== Basic Properties ==
Some facts about supersolvable groups:

- Supersolvable groups are always polycyclic, and hence solvable.
- Every finitely generated nilpotent group is supersolvable.
- Every metacyclic group is supersolvable.
- The commutator subgroup of a supersolvable group is nilpotent.
- Subgroups and quotient groups of supersolvable groups are supersolvable.
- A finite supersolvable group has an invariant normal series with each factor cyclic of prime order.
- In fact, the primes can be chosen in a nice order: For every prime p, and for π the set of primes greater than p, a finite supersolvable group has a unique Hall π-subgroup. Such groups are sometimes called ordered Sylow tower groups.
- Every group of square-free order, and every group with cyclic Sylow subgroups (a Z-group), is supersolvable.
- Every irreducible complex representation of a finite supersolvable group is monomial, that is, induced from a linear character of a subgroup. In other words, every finite supersolvable group is a monomial group.
- Every maximal subgroup in a supersolvable group has prime index.
- A finite group is supersolvable if and only if every maximal subgroup has prime index.
- A finite group is supersolvable if and only if every maximal chain of subgroups has the same length. This is important to those interested in the lattice of subgroups of a group, and is sometimes called the Jordan–Dedekind chain condition.
- Moreover, a finite group is supersolvable if and only if its lattice of subgroups is a supersolvable lattice, a significant strengthening of the Jordan-Dedekind chain condition.
- By Baum's theorem, every supersolvable finite group has a DFT algorithm running in time O(n log n).
