= Hall–Littlewood polynomials =

In mathematics, the Hall–Littlewood polynomials are symmetric functions depending on a parameter t and a partition λ. They are Schur functions when t is 0 and monomial symmetric functions when t is 1 and are special cases of Macdonald polynomials. They were first defined indirectly by Philip Hall using the Hall algebra, and later defined directly by Dudley E. Littlewood (1961).

== Definition ==
The Hall–Littlewood polynomial P is defined by

$$P_\lambda(x_1,\ldots,x_n;t) = \left( \prod_{i\geq 0} \prod_{j=1}^{m(i)} \frac{1-t}{1-t^{j}} \right)
{\sum_{w\in S_n}w\left(x_1^{\lambda_1}\cdots x_n^{\lambda_n}\prod_{i<j}\frac{x_i-tx_j}{x_i-x_j}\right)},$$

where λ is a partition of at most n with elements λ_{i}, and m(i) elements equal to i, and S_{n} is the symmetric group of order n!.

As an example,

$$P_{42}(x_1,x_2;t) = x_1^4 x_2^2 + x_1^2 x_2^4 + (1-t) x_1^3 x_2^3$$

=== Specializations ===
We have that $P_\lambda(x;1) = m_\lambda(x)$, $P_\lambda(x;0) = s_\lambda(x)$ and $P_\lambda(x;-1) = P_\lambda(x)$ where the latter is the Schur P polynomials.

== Properties ==
Expanding the Schur polynomials in terms of the Hall–Littlewood polynomials, one has

$$s_\lambda(x) = \sum_\mu K_{\lambda\mu}(t) P_\mu(x,t)$$

where $K_{\lambda\mu}(t)$ are the Kostka–Foulkes polynomials. Note that as $t=1$, these reduce to the ordinary Kostka coefficients.

A combinatorial description for the Kostka–Foulkes polynomials was given by Lascoux and Schützenberger,

$$K_{\lambda\mu}(t) = \sum_{T \in SSYT(\lambda,\mu)} t^{\mathrm{charge}(T)}$$

where "charge" is a certain combinatorial statistic on semistandard Young tableaux, and the sum is taken over the set $SSYT(\lambda,\mu)$ of all semi-standard Young tableaux T with shape λ and type μ.

== See also ==
- Hall polynomial
