= Zappa–Szép product =

Mathematics concept

In mathematics, especially group theory, the Zappa–Szép product (also known as the Zappa–Rédei–Szép product, general product, knit product, exact factorization or bicrossed product) describes a way in which a group can be constructed from two subgroups. It is a generalization of the direct and semidirect products. It is named after Guido Zappa (1940) and Jenő Szép (1950) although it was independently studied by others including B.H. Neumann (1935), G.A. Miller (1935), and J.A. de Séguier (1904).

== Internal Zappa–Szép products ==
Let G be a group with identity element e, and let H and K be subgroups of G. The following statements are equivalent:

- G = HK and H ∩ K = {e}
- For each g in G, there exists a unique h in H and a unique k in K such that g = hk.

If either (and hence both) of these statements hold, then G is said to be an internal Zappa–Szép product of H and K.

== Examples ==
Let G = GL(n,C), the general linear group of invertible n × n matrices over the complex numbers. For each matrix A in G, the QR decomposition asserts that there exists a unique unitary matrix Q and a unique upper triangular matrix R with positive real entries on the main diagonal such that A = QR. Thus G is a Zappa–Szép product of the unitary group U(n) and the group (say) K of upper triangular matrices with positive diagonal entries.

One of the most important examples of this is Philip Hall's 1937 theorem on the existence of Sylow systems for soluble groups. This shows that every soluble group is a Zappa–Szép product of a Hall p'-subgroup and a Sylow p-subgroup, and in fact that the group is a (multiple factor) Zappa–Szép product of a certain set of representatives of its Sylow subgroups.

In 1935, George Miller showed that any non-regular transitive permutation group with a regular subgroup is a Zappa–Szép product of the regular subgroup and a point stabilizer. He gives PSL(2,11) and the alternating group of degree 5 as examples, and every alternating group of prime degree is also an example. This same paper gives a number of examples of groups which cannot be realized as Zappa–Szép products of proper subgroups, such as the quaternion group and the alternating group of degree 6.

== External Zappa–Szép products ==
As with the direct and semidirect products, there is an external version of the Zappa–Szép product for groups which are not known a priori to be subgroups of a given group. To motivate this, let G = HK be an internal Zappa–Szép product of subgroups H and K of the group G. For each k in K and each h in H, there exist α(k, h) in H and β(k, h) in K such that kh = α(k, h) β(k, h). This defines mappings α : K × H → H and β : K × H → K which turn out to have the following properties:

- α(e, h) = h and β(k, e) = k for all h in H and k in K.
- α(k_{1}k_{2}, h) = α(k_{1}, α(k_{2}, h))
- β(k, h_{1}h_{2}) = β(β(k, h_{1}), h_{2})
- α(k, h_{1}h_{2}) = α(k, h_{1})α(β(k, h_{1}), h_{2})
- β(k_{1}k_{2}, h) = β(k_{1}, α(k_{2}, h))β(k_{2}, h)

for all h_{1}, h_{2} in H, k_{1}, k_{2} in K. From these, it follows that

- For each k in K, the mapping h ↦ α(k, h) is a bijection of H.
- For each h in H, the mapping k ↦ β(k, h) is a bijection of K.

(Indeed, suppose α(k, h_{1}) = α(k, h_{2}). Then h_{1} = α(k^{−1}k, h_{1}) = α(k^{−1}, α(k, h_{1})) = α(k^{−1}, α(k, h_{2})) = h_{2}. This establishes injectivity, and for surjectivity, use h = α(k, α(k^{−1},h)).)

More concisely, the first three properties above assert the mapping α : K × H → H is a left action of K on (the underlying set of) H and that β : K × H → K is a right action of H on (the underlying set of) K. If we denote the left action by h → ^{k}h and the right action by k → k^{h}, then the last two properties amount to ^{k}(h_{1}h_{2}) = ^{k}h_{1} ^{k^{h_{1}}}h_{2} and (k_{1}k_{2})^{h} = k_{1}^{^{k_{2}}h} k_{2}^{h}.

Turning this around, suppose H and K are groups (and let e denote each group's identity element) and suppose there exist mappings α : K × H → H and β : K × H → K satisfying the properties above. On the cartesian product H × K, define a multiplication and an inversion mapping by, respectively,

- (h_{1}, k_{1})(h_{2}, k_{2}) = (h_{1}α(k_{1}, h_{2}), β(k_{1}, h_{2})k_{2})
- (h, k)^{−1} = (α(k^{−1},h^{−1}), β(k^{−1},h^{−1}))

Then H × K is a group called the external Zappa–Szép product of the groups H and K. The subsets H × {e} and {e} × K are subgroups isomorphic to H and K, respectively, and H × K is, in fact, an internal Zappa–Szép product of H × {e} and {e} × K.

== Relation to semidirect and direct products ==
Let G = HK be an internal Zappa–Szép product of subgroups H and K. If H is normal in G, then the mappings α and β are given by, respectively, α(k,h) = k h k^{− 1} and β(k, h) = k. This is easy to see because $(h_1k_1)(h_2k_2) = (h_1k_1h_2k_1^{-1})(k_1k_2)$ and $h_1k_1h_2k_1^{-1}\in H$ since by normality of $H$, $k_1h_2k_1^{-1}\in H$. In this case, G is an internal semidirect product of H and K.

If, in addition, K is normal in G, then α(k,h) = h. In this case, G is an internal direct product of H and K.

== See also ==
Complement (group theory)
