= Prosolvable group =

In mathematics, more precisely in algebra, a prosolvable group (less common: prosoluble group) is a group that is isomorphic to the inverse limit of an inverse system of solvable groups. Equivalently, a group is called prosolvable, if, viewed as a topological group, every open neighborhood of the identity contains a normal subgroup whose corresponding quotient group is a solvable group.

== Examples ==
- Let p be a prime, and denote the field of p-adic numbers, as usual, by $\mathbf{Q}_p$. Then the Galois group $\text{Gal}(\overline{\mathbf{Q}}_p/\mathbf{Q}_p)$, where $\overline{\mathbf{Q}}_p$ denotes the algebraic closure of $\mathbf{Q}_p$, is prosolvable. This follows from the fact that, for any finite Galois extension $L$ of $\mathbf{Q}_p$, the Galois group $\text{Gal}(L/\mathbf{Q}_p)$ can be written as semidirect product $\text{Gal}(L/\mathbf{Q}_p)=(R \rtimes Q) \rtimes P$, with $P$ cyclic of order $f$ for some $f\in\mathbf{N}$, $Q$ cyclic of order dividing $p^f-1$, and $R$ of $p$-power order. Therefore, $\text{Gal}(L/\mathbf{Q}_p)$ is solvable.

== See also ==
- Galois theory
