= Roger Carter (mathematician) =

British mathematician (1934–2022)

Roger W. Carter
- Born: 25 August 1934
- Died: 21 February 2022 (aged 87); Wirral, England
- Education: University of Cambridge
- Known for: Groups of Lie type; Carter subgroup
- Scientific career
- Fields: Mathematics
- Workplaces: University of Warwick
- Thesis: Some Contributions to the Theory of Finite Soluble Groups (1960)
- Doctoral advisor: Derek Taunt
- Doctoral students: James Franklin, Jacqui Ramagge

Roger William Carter (25 August 1934 – 21 February 2022) was a British mathematician who was emeritus professor at the University of Warwick. He defined Carter subgroups and wrote the standard reference Simple Groups of Lie Type. He obtained his PhD at the University of Cambridge in 1960 and his dissertation was entitled Some Contributions to the Theory of Finite Soluble Groups, with Derek Taunt as thesis advisor. Carter died in Wirral on 21 February 2022, at the age of 87.

== Publications ==
- Carter, Roger W. (1961). "Nilpotent self normalizing subgroups of soluble groups". Mathematische Zeitschrift. 75 (2): 136–139. doi:10.1007/BF01211016. S2CID 120448397.
- Simple Groups of Lie Type by Roger W. Carter, ISBN 0-471-50683-4
- Lie Algebras of Finite and Affine Type (Cambridge Studies in Advanced Mathematics) by Roger Carter, ISBN 0-521-85138-6
- Carter, Roger W. (1993), Finite Groups of Lie Type: Conjugacy Classes and Complex Characters, Wiley Classics Library, Chichester: Wiley, ISBN 978-0-471-94109-5
