= Hall algebra =

In mathematics, the Hall algebra is an associative algebra with a basis corresponding to isomorphism classes of finite abelian p-groups. It was first discussed by Steinitz (1901) but forgotten until it was rediscovered by Philip Hall (1959), both of whom published no more than brief summaries of their work. The Hall polynomials are the structure constants of the Hall algebra. The Hall algebra plays an important role in the theory of Masaki Kashiwara and George Lusztig regarding canonical bases in quantum groups. Ringel (1990) generalized Hall algebras to more general categories, such as the category of representations of a quiver.

== Construction ==
A finite abelian p-group M is a direct sum of cyclic p-power components $C_{p^{\lambda_i}},$ where $\lambda=(\lambda_1,\lambda_2,\ldots)$ is a partition of $n$ called the type of M. Let $g^\lambda_{\mu,\nu}(p)$ be the number of subgroups N of M such that N has type $\nu$ and the quotient M/N has type $\mu$. Hall proved that the functions g are polynomial functions of p with integer coefficients. Thus we may replace p with an indeterminate q, which results in the Hall polynomials

$$g^\lambda_{\mu,\nu}(q)\in\mathbb{Z}[q]. \,$$

Hall next constructs an associative ring $H$ over $\mathbb{Z}[q]$, now called the Hall algebra. This ring has a basis consisting of the symbols $u_\lambda$ and the structure constants of the multiplication in this basis are given by the Hall polynomials:

$$u_\mu u_\nu = \sum_\lambda g^\lambda_{\mu,\nu}(q) u_\lambda. \,$$

It turns out that H is a commutative ring, freely generated by the elements $u_{\mathbf1^n}$ corresponding to the elementary p-groups. The linear map from H to the algebra of symmetric functions defined on the generators by the formula

$$u_{\mathbf 1^n} \mapsto q^{-n(n-1)/2}e_n \,$$

(where e_{n} is the nth elementary symmetric function) uniquely extends to a ring homomorphism and the images of the basis elements $u_\lambda$ may be interpreted via the Hall–Littlewood symmetric functions. Specializing q to 1, these symmetric functions become Schur functions, which are thus closely connected with the theory of Hall polynomials.
