= Jacqui Ramagge =

British-Australian mathematician

- Education: University of Warwick
- Scientific career
- Fields: Mathematics
- Workplaces: James Cook University; University of South Australia; Durham University; University of Sydney; University of Wollongong; University of Newcastle
- Thesis: On some twisted Kac-Moody groups (1992)
- Doctoral advisor: Roger Carter

Jacqui Ramagge is an English-Australian mathematician. She is Deputy Vice Chancellor at James Cook University. She was previously the executive dean of STEM at the University of South Australia. She was born in London, and emigrated to Australia in 1991.

She is a Fellow of the Royal Society of New South Wales and was the President of the Australian Mathematical Society (AustMS) from 2019 to 2020.

== Early life and education ==
Ramagge was born in London into a family of Spanish immigrants. Consequently, her first language is Spanish and her native language is English. Her school years were spent first at Hallfield Primary School and later at Holland Park Comprehensive School. Until the age of 18 all her summers were spent in a village in northern Spain. Ramagge was the first person in her family to go to university.

Ramagge studied at the University of Warwick, where she obtained a BA (First Class) in mathematics in 1988, an MSc in mathematics in 1990, and a PhD in 1993. During her PhD, Ramagge won the 1993 B. H. Neumann Prize for the most outstanding talk presented by a student at the Annual Meeting of the AustMS.

== Academic career ==
From 1993 to 2007, Ramagge worked as an academic at the University of Newcastle. In 2005, she was the Assistant Dean of Marketing and Recruitment in the Faculty of Science and IT and she was Director of the Women@UoN program in 2006, providing professional development of both academic and professional staff at the University of Newcastle.

From 2007 to 2015, Ramagge was an academic at the University of Wollongong. She was Director of the Australian Mathematical Science Institute Summer School held there over the summer of 2008—2009 and served as the Head of School of Mathematics and Applied Statistics 2009–2015.

Ramagge was appointed as Professor of Mathematics at the University of Sydney in 2015, making her the second woman Professor of Mathematics in the history of the institution, the first having been Professor Nalini Joshi. Ramagge was Head of School of Mathematics and Statistics from 2016–2019. During this time, she supported the establishment of the Sydney Mathematical Research Institute, working with Professor Geordie Williamson and Professor Anthony Henderson to raise $6.5 million of philanthropic donations from the Simon Marais Foundation, the Hooper Shaw Foundation and individuals to found the institute.

After a stint as executive dean of science at Durham University in the UK, Ramagge became executive dean of STEM at the University of South Australia in 2023.

== Research interests ==
Ramagge’s research interests overlap algebra, analysis and geometry. Her current major projects focus on the general structure theory of totally disconnected, locally compact groups; and operator algebras.

In the field of totally disconnected, locally compact groups, Ramagge is driving the development of the geometric aspects of the theory. In operator algebras, she works mainly on C*-algebras, which were introduced to provide mathematical models for quantum mechanics, and in classifying their equilibrium states. Her work in functional analysis on buildings with Robertson and Steger provided insights into the Baum-Connes conjecture.

Ramagge has published 28 research publications (correct of March 2021) in the areas of group theory, functional analysis, operator algebras, control theory, and statistical analyses of learning outcomes. She has received 10 Australian Research Council (ARC) grants since 2002.

=== Selected publications ===
- Praeger, Cheryl E.; Ramagge, Jacqui; Willis, George (2020). "A graph-theoretic description of scale-multiplicative semigroups of automorphisms". Israel Journal of Mathematics. 237: 221–265. arXiv:1710.00439. doi:10.1007/s11856-020-2005-0.
- Laca, Marcelo; Raeburn, Iain; Ramagge, Jacqui; Whittaker, Michael F. (2018). "Equilibrium states on operator algebras associated to self-similar actions of groupoids on graphs". Advances in Mathematics. 331: 268–325. arXiv:1610.00343. doi:10.1016/j.aim.2018.03.030. S2CID 119611945.
- Ram, Arun; Ramagge, Jacqui (2004). "Affine Hecke algebras, cyclotomic Hecke algebras and Clifford theory". arXiv:math/0401322. A tribute to C. S. Seshadri (Chennai, 2002), 428–466, Trends Math., Birkhäuser, Basel.
- Ramagge, J.; Robertson, G.; Steger, T. A Haagerup inequality for A˜1×A˜1 and A˜2 buildings. Geom. Funct. Anal. 8 (1998), no. 4, 702–731.

== Awards, honours and memberships ==
Ramagge became a Fellow of AustMS in 2014, having been closely involved with the Society since 1992. She was President Elect in 2018, President 2019–2020, and Immediate Past President in 2021 [4], continuing to serve as President after her return to the UK in 2020. She has been an Editor of the AustMS’s Lecture Series since 2011 and was Chief Editor from 2017–2019.

Ramagge became a Fellow of the Royal Society of New South Wales in 2019.

In 2013, Ramagge won the B. H. Neumann Award for Excellence in Mathematics Enrichment from the Australian Mathematics Trust, having served on the Primary Problems Committee since its inception in 2001.

Ramagge has also held the following memberships and leadership roles:

- Chair of the Australian Council of Heads of Maths and Stats (2017–2018)
- Member of the Board of the Australian Mathematics Trust (2016—2020)
- Member of the Mathematics, Information and Computing Sciences Research Evaluation Committee, Australian Research Council (ARC) Excellence for Research in Australia (2015, 2018)
- Chair of the ARC Australian Laureate Fellowship Selection Advisory Committee (2014), Committee member (2012–2014)
- Member of University of Wollongong Council, the governing body of the institution (2013—2015)
- Member of the Australian Curriculum, Assessment and Reporting Authority (ACARA): Senior Secondary Mathematics Curriculum Advisory Panel (2012)
- Member of the Australian Academy of Science National Committee for the Mathematical Sciences (2011–2014, 2019–2020)
- Member of ARC College of Experts, Engineering, Mathematics and Informatics Panel (2010–2012)
- Australian Mathematical Sciences Institute (AMSI) Educational Advisory Committee (2009---2019)
- Judge on the Committee for the AustMS B. H. Neumann Prize (1995–2005), seven times as Chair
