= Bertram Huppert =

German mathematician (1927–2023)

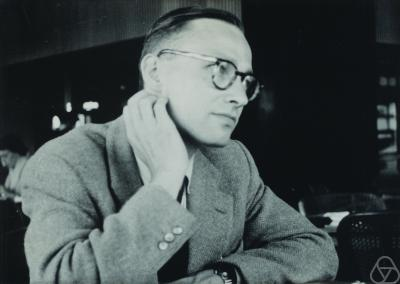
Bertram Huppert

Bertram Huppert (22 October 1927 – 1 October 2023) was a German mathematician specialised in group theory and the representation theory of finite groups. His Endliche Gruppen (finite groups) is an influential textbook in group theory, and he has over 50 doctoral descendants.

== Life ==
=== Early life and education ===
Bertram Huppert was born in Worms, Germany on 22 October 1927. He went to school in Bonn from 1934 until 1945. In 1950, he wrote his diploma thesis in mathematics at the University of Mainz. The thesis discussed "nicht fortsetzbare Potenzreihen" (discontinuous power series), and was written under the direction of Helmut Wielandt.

When Wielandt moved to the University of Tübingen in April 1951, Huppert followed him later in the year, and gained his doctorate (as Wielandt's first doctoral student) with the work "Produkte von paarweise vertauschbaren zyklischen Gruppen" (products of pairwise permutable cyclic groups), in which he showed, among other things, that such groups were supersoluble. This was the first of more than forty further scientific works, not including his books and monographs. The focus of the dissertation was very close to Wielandt's interests at the time, whose 1951 work shows that the product of pairwise permutable nilpotent groups is solvable.

=== Academic career ===
Huppert spent the years 1963/64 as a visiting professor at the University of Illinois at Urbana-Champaign and at the California Institute of Technology (Caltech) in Pasadena. In January 1965, he became a professor of pure mathematics at the University of Mainz, where he later became a professor emeritus in 1994. He put a lot of effort into building up the Mainz group theory and abstract algebra research groups.

Following an assignment, he wrote a monumental standard text in the theory of finite groups, Endliche Gruppen I. The group around Wolfgang Gaschütz in Kiel provided important contributions in discussions to that volume. Volumes II and III appeared 14 years later in English with co-author Norman Blackburn.

In 1984, Huppert founded, together with Gerhard O. Michler, the first Deutsche Forschungsgemeinschaft priority programme in Mathematics at the German universities of Aachen, Bielefeld, Essen and Mainz.

From 1964 to 1985, Huppert was a member of the editorial board of the Journal of Algebra. Together with Wolfgang Gaschütz and Karl W. Gruenberg, he organised Oberwolfach workshops on group theory over many years, and with Michler the Oberwolfach workshop on representation theory.

Huppert was a founding member of the Institute of Experimental Mathematics of the University of Essen and is a member of the Akademie gemeinnütziger Wissenschaften zu Erfurt.

== Death ==
Huppert died on 1 October 2023, at the age of 95.

== Selected bibliography ==
- 1967: Endliche Gruppen (Springer) ISBN 978-3-540-03825-2
- 1981/82: (with N. Blackburn) Finite Groups II, III (Springer) ISBN 978-0-387-10632-8 und ISBN 978-3-540-10633-3
- 1979: (with F.J. Fritz & Wolfgang Willems) Stochastische Matrizen (Springer) ISBN 978-3-540-09126-4
- 1990: Angewandte Lineare Algebra (de Gruyter), ISBN 978-3-11-012107-0
- 1998: Character Theory of Finite Groups (de Gruyter), ISBN 978-3-11-015421-4
- 2006: (with Wolfgang Willems) Lineare Algebra (Teubner), ISBN 978-3-8351-0089-3

== Sources ==
- Wolfgang Willems: Laudatio gehalten am 19. Juni 1998 in Mainz bei einem Festkolloquium aus Anlaß des 70. Geburtstags von Professor Dr. Bertram Huppert. (Postscript file)
