= Karl W. Gruenberg =

British mathematician

Karl Walter Gruenberg
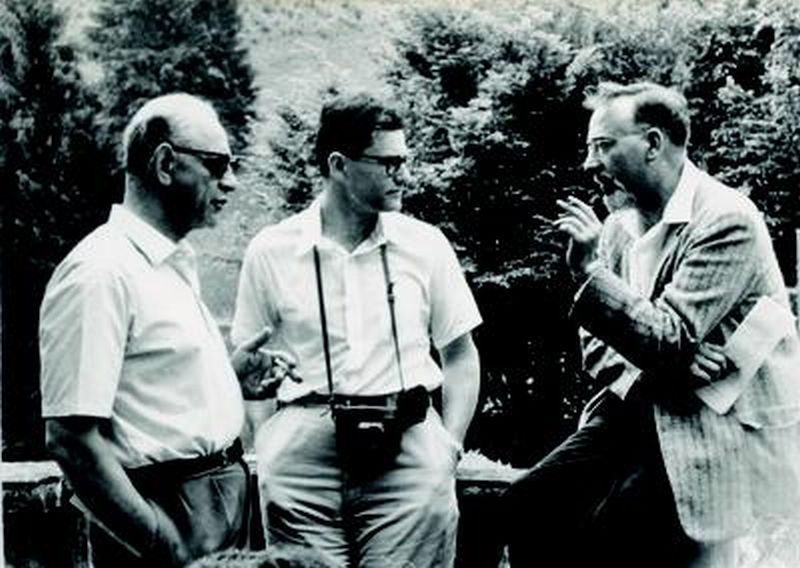
- Karl W. Gruenberg (center) with K. A. Hirsch (left) and R. H. Bruck (right)
- Born: 3 June 1928; Vienna, Austria
- Died: 10 October 2007; London, England
- Education: Magdalene College, Cambridge
- Known for: cohomology theory of groups
- Spouses: Katherine; Margaret
- Scientific career
- Fields: Mathematics
- Workplaces: Queen Mary College; London University
- Thesis: A Contribution to the Theory of Commutators in Groups and Associative Rings
- Doctoral advisor: Philip Hall

Karl W. Gruenberg (3 June 1928 – 10 October 2007) was a British mathematician who specialised in group theory, in particular with the cohomology theory of groups.

== Education and career ==
At the age of eleven, Gruenberg was one of the many Jewish children sent from Austria to Great Britain as part of the Kindertransport in 1939. Most of the Kindertransport children never saw their parents again but Karl was lucky and his mother soon joined him, and they moved to London in 1943 where he entered Kilburn Grammar School. In 1946 he won a scholarship to study mathematics at Magdalene College, Cambridge, where he received a BA degree in 1950 (duly promoted to MA (Cantab.) in 1954).

He was appointed as an Assistant Lecturer in Mathematics at Queen Mary College, London University from 1953 to 1955. He got his PhD in 1954 under Philip Hall at Cambridge with his treatise "A Contribution to the Theory of Commutators in Groups and Associative Rings". He was awarded a Commonwealth Fund Fellowship which made it possible for him to spend 1955–56 at Harvard and then 1956–57 at the Institute for Advanced Study in Princeton, New Jersey. In 1948 he became a British citizen.

In 1967 he moved back to Queen Mary College where he became a leading figure in the algebra research community and where he remained for the rest of his career. He became a professor in the Department of Pure Mathematics where he worked with Bertram Huppert and Wolfgang Gaschütz organising the group theory conferences at the Mathematical Research Institute of Oberwolfach in Germany.

He had a son Mark and a daughter Anne by his first wife Katherine. For thirty years he was married to his second wife Margaret.

== Works ==
papers

- The Universal Coefficient Theorem in the Cohomology of Groups Journal of the London Mathematical Society 27 May 1966
- Some cohomological notes in group theory, Queen Mary College Math. Notes, 1968
- Relation modules of finite groups, CBMS Regional Conf. Series Math., American Mathematical Society 1976

books

- 1970 Cohomological topics in group theory ISBN 978-3-540-36303-3
- 1977 Linear geometry (with A. J. Weir), Springer-Verlag
- 1984 Group theory : essays for Philip Hall, J E Roseblade & Philip Hall, London : Academic Press, ISBN 012304880X
- 1988 The collected works of Philip Hall (with J. E. Roseblade), Clarendon Press, 1988, ISBN 0198532547
- 2002 Una introduzione all'algebra omologica
