= Monomial group =

In mathematics, in the area of algebra studying the character theory of finite groups, an M-group or monomial group is a finite group whose complex irreducible characters are all monomial, that is, induced from characters of degree 1.

In this section only finite groups are considered. A monomial group is solvable. Every supersolvable group and every solvable A-group is a monomial group. Factor groups of monomial groups are monomial, but subgroups need not be, since every finite solvable group can be embedded in a monomial group.

The symmetric group $S_4$ is an example of a monomial group that is neither supersolvable nor an A-group. The special linear group $\operatorname{SL}_2(\mathbb F_3)$ is the smallest finite group that is not monomial: since the abelianization of this group has order three, its irreducible characters of degree two are not monomial.
