= Schreier refinement theorem =

Statement in group theory

In mathematics, the Schreier refinement theorem of group theory states that any two subnormal series of subgroups of a given group have equivalent refinements, where two series are equivalent if there is a bijection between their factor groups that sends each factor group to an isomorphic one.

The theorem is named after the Austrian mathematician Otto Schreier who proved it in 1928. It provides an elegant proof of the Jordan–Hölder theorem. It is often proved using the Zassenhaus lemma. Baumslag (2006) gives a short proof by intersecting the terms in one subnormal series with those in the other series.

== Example ==
Consider $\mathbb{Z}_2 \times S_3$, where $S_3$ is the symmetric group of degree 3. The alternating group $A_3$ is a normal subgroup of $S_3$, so we have the two subnormal series

$$\{0\} \times \{(1)\} \; \triangleleft \; \mathbb{Z}_2 \times \{(1)\} \; \triangleleft \; \mathbb{Z}_2 \times S_3,$$
$$\{0\} \times \{(1)\} \; \triangleleft \; \{0\} \times A_3 \; \triangleleft \; \mathbb{Z}_2 \times S_3,$$

with respective factor groups $(\mathbb{Z}_2,S_3)$ and $(A_3,\mathbb{Z}_2\times\mathbb{Z}_2)$.
The two subnormal series are not equivalent, but they have equivalent refinements:

$$\{0\} \times \{(1)\} \; \triangleleft \; \mathbb{Z}_2 \times \{(1)\} \; \triangleleft \; \mathbb{Z}_2 \times A_3 \; \triangleleft \; \mathbb{Z}_2 \times S_3$$

with factor groups isomorphic to $(\mathbb{Z}_2, A_3, \mathbb{Z}_2)$ and

$$\{0\} \times \{(1)\} \; \triangleleft \; \{0\} \times A_3 \; \triangleleft \; \{0\} \times S_3 \; \triangleleft \; \mathbb{Z}_2 \times S_3$$

with factor groups isomorphic to $(A_3, \mathbb{Z}_2, \mathbb{Z}_2)$.
