= Angela Verren =

British artist (1930–2023)

Angela Verren (née Chick; 1930-2023), later Angela Verren–Taunt, was a British artist.

== Biography ==
Verren was born in Hampstead in north London and studied at King's College, London. For many years Verren painted and sketched in Britain and abroad at Tuscany and Greece and had exhibitions in both London and Cambridge, with her works often showing forms abstracted from nature. After marrying the Cambridge mathematician Derek Taunt and raising three children, Verren resumed her painting and exhibition career. In 1970 she met the artist Ben Nicholson who became a good friend and a great influence on her art, and who wrote the introduction to her 1978 solo exhibition at the Crane Kalman Gallery in London. After Nicholson's death, Verren became the copyright holder for his artworks.

Verren died in 2023.
