= Ferenc Forgó =

Hungarian mathematician, economist

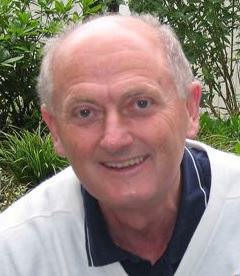
Ferenc Forgó in 2005

Ferenc Forgó (born 16 April 1942 in Pécs) is a Hungarian economist and mathematician. He is a Doctor of the Hungarian Academy of Sciences and professor emeritus at the Corvinus University of Budapest. His main research interests have been mathematical programming and game theory.

== Early life and career ==
Between 1960 and 1965, Forgó studied at the Károly Marx University of Economics, where he was one of the first students to graduate as an economist / mathematician. After graduation, he joined the Mathematics Department and soon became an assistant professor. In 1970, he spent a year in the United States as a Ford Foundation Fellow at the University of Southern California, Los Angeles. In 1974, he successfully defended his PhD thesis in economics. He became a full professor in 1991 and professor emeritus after retiring in 2012. In 2015, he became a Doctor of the Hungarian National Academy.

For decades, Forgó was a member of the editorial board of several journals: PUMA (Pure Mathematics and Applications), Central European Journal of Operations Research, Szigma, and the Journal of Applied Mathematics.

== Scientific work ==
In the first phase of his scientific career, Forgó's main interests were the theory, methods, and applications of nonlinear mathematical programming. In his first paper in English, in 1969, he studied the relationship between the mixed 0-1 integer linear programming problem and certain quadratic programming problems. In the same year, he published a paper on the relation between zero-sum two-player games and linear programming. In 1972, he published an article in Acta Cybernetica on the solution of non-convex programming problems by the cutting plane method; his PhD thesis also dealt with this topic in 1974.

A series of conference presentations and journal publications preceded his book Nonconvex and Discrete Programming, published in 1978, which for many years was one of the fundamental works on the subject in Hungarian. Ten years later, in 1988, Akadémiai Kiadó published Nonconvex Programming, an extended and improved edition. In the 1980s, Forgó applied game-theoretic and mathematical programming methods in a decision-theoretic framework to the solution of multi-objective decision problems, writing articles and papers on the subject in both English and Hungarian. His articles with József Abaffy (1993) and István Joó (1999) in the Journal of Optimization Theory and Applications and the Journal of Global Optimization demonstrate his wide interest in certain areas of optimization.

In the 1990s, his research interest turned almost exclusively to game theory. The most important solution concept for non-cooperative games is the Nash equilibrium. From both a theoretical and an application point of view, the key question is in which models and under which conditions the Nash equilibrium exists. In a 1994 paper, Forgó used a generalized notion of convexity (CF-convexity) which enabled him to prove the existence of the Nash equilibrium point under conditions that are weaker than those previously used. As an application, in 1995, he gave sufficient conditions for the existence of a pure Nash equilibrium point of the Cournot oligopoly game for a nonlinear demand function and a nonconvex cost function. He, together with István Joó, proved a two-function minimax theorem under generalized convexity conditions. The paper appeared in Archiv der Mathematik in 1999 and has been cited many times.

In 1999, Forgó and Joó published a paper in the Journal of Global Optimization which opened a new avenue in the area of generalization of Nash equilibria. Several fixed point and Nash-like existence theorems were proved in pseudoconvex spaces, a notable generalization of traditional convex spaces.

Forgó’s attention then turned towards another kind of generalization of Nash equilibrium: Aumann’s correlated equilibrium. In his 2010 paper in Mathematical Social Sciences, he defined soft correlated equilibrium which enables players to achieve higher social welfare than that of Nash’s. In a series of papers, the performance of soft equilibrium was determined or estimated for some classes of two-facility congestion games including the prisoner’s dilemma and the chicken game.

In a recent paper, Forgó and Kánnai gave necessary conditions for an oligopoly game to have a Cournot-Nash equilibrium in terms of the concavity of the (generalized) demand function and convexity of the cost functions.

== Bibliography ==
=== Books ===
- Forgó, Ferenc; Szép, Jenő (1983). Einführung in die Spieltheorie (in German). Budapest: Akadémiai Kiadó. ISBN 9789630528856. OCLC 11756589.
- Forgó, Ferenc; Szép, Jenő (1985). Introduction to the Theory of Games. Mathematics and its Applications, volume 17. Springer Dordrecht. doi:10.1007/978-94-009-5193-8. ISBN 978-90-277-1404-6. ISSN 0169-507X.
- Forgó, Ferenc (1988). Nonconvex programming. Budapest: Akadémiai Kiadó. ISBN 9789630544535. OCLC 18960800.
- Forgó, Ferenc; Szép, Jenő; Szidarovszky, Ferenc (1999). Introduction to the theory of games: concepts, methods, applications. Kluwer Academic Publishers, Dordrecht. ISBN 9780792357759. OCLC 41256193.

=== Book chapters ===
- Forgó, Ferenc (1984). "A game theoretic approach for multicriteria decision making". Lecture Notes in Economics and Mathematical Systems 229. SpringerVerlag. pp. 41–46.
- Forgó, Ferenc (1994). "On the Existence of Nash-equilibrium in N-person Generalized Concave Games". In Komlósi, Sándor; Rapcsák, Tamás; Schaible, Siegfried (eds.). Generalized Convexity : Proceedings, Pécs, Hungary, 1992. Springer-Verlag. pp. 53–61. ISBN 354057624X.
- Forgó, Ferenc; Joó, István (1998). "Necessary conditions for two-function minimax inequalities". In Giannessi, Franco; Komlósi, Sándor; Rapcsák, Tamás (eds.). New Trends in Mathematical Programming. Applied Optimization, vol 13. Boston, MA: Springer US. pp. 59–64. doi:10.1007/978-1-4757-2878-1_6. ISBN 978-1-4757-2878-1.
- Forgó, Ferenc (2017). "The Non-symmetric L-Nash Bargaining Solution". In Matsumoto, Akio (ed.). Optimization and Dynamics with Their Applications: Essays in Honor of Ferenc Szidarovszky. Singapore: Springer. pp. 23–29. doi:10.1007/978-981-10-4214-0_2. ISBN 978-981-10-4214-0.
- Forgó, Ferenc; Kánnai, Zoltán (2020). "Necessary Conditions for Concave and Cournot Oligopoly Games". In Szidarovszky, Ferenc; Bischi, Gian Italo (eds.). Games and Dynamics in Economics: Essays in Honor of Akio Matsumoto. Singapore: Springer Singapore. pp. 185–194. doi:10.1007/978-981-15-3623-6. ISBN 978-981-15-3622-9. S2CID 241249956.

=== Journal articles ===
- Forgó, Ferenc (1972). "Cutting plane methods for solving nonconvex programming problems". Acta Cybernetica. 1 (3): 171–192.
- Forgó, Ferenc; Temesi, József (1987-04-01). "Computer aided licence selection". Engineering Costs and Production Economics. 11 (1): 161–170. doi:10.1016/0167-188X(87)90039-5. ISSN 0167-188X.
- Forgó, Ferenc (1990). "An iterative method for solving decomposable nonlinear equation systems". Pure Mathematics and Applications. B. 1 (1): 67–71.
- Forgó, Ferenc; Schick, G. J. (1990). "A Bayesian approach for updating weights of criteria for multicriteria decision problems". Pure Mathematics and Applications. C. 2 (3): 87–95.
- Abaffy, József; Forgó, Ferenc (1993-05-01). "Globally convergent algorithm for solving nonlinear equations". Journal of Optimization Theory and Applications. 77 (2): 291–304. doi:10.1007/BF00940713. ISSN 1573-2878. S2CID 121942205.
- Forgó, Ferenc (1995). "Cournot Nash equilibrium in non-concave oligopoly games". Pure Mathematics and Applications. 6 (2): 161–169.
- Forgó, Ferenc; Joó, István (1997). "Necessary Conditions for Maxmin=Minmax". Acta Mathematica Hungarica. 77: 123–135. doi:10.1023/A:1006539807749. S2CID 120002848.
- Forgó, Ferenc; Joó, István (1998-11-01). "A general nontopological two-function minimax theorem". Archiv der Mathematik. 71 (5): 376–383. doi:10.1007/s000130050280. S2CID 123823729.
- Forgó, Ferenc; Joó, István (1999-01-01). "Fixed Point and Equilibrium Theorems in Pseudoconvex and Related Spaces". Journal of Global Optimization. 14 (1): 27–54. doi:10.1023/A:1008252724328. ISSN 1573-2916. S2CID 16878822.
- Forgó, Ferenc; Szidarovszky, Ferenc (1999-09-01). "On consistency of income and cost sharing". Socio-Economic Planning Sciences. 33 (3): 221–230. doi:10.1016/S0038-0121(99)00002-6. ISSN 0038-0121.
- Forgó, Ferenc; Szidarovszky, Ferenc (2003-05-16). "On the relation between the Nash bargaining solution and the weighting method". European Journal of Operational Research. 147 (1): 108–116. doi:10.1016/S0377-2217(02)00241-2. ISSN 0377-2217.
- Forgó, Ferenc; Fülöp, János; Prill, Mária (2005-01-01). "Game theoretic models for climate change negotiations". European Journal of Operational Research. Applications of Mathematical Programming Models. 160 (1): 252–267. doi:10.1016/j.ejor.2003.06.025. ISSN 0377-2217.
- Forgó, Ferenc; Fülöp, János (2008-12-01). "On the implementation of the L-Nash bargaining solution in two-person bargaining games". Central European Journal of Operations Research. 16 (4): 359–377. doi:10.1007/s10100-008-0064-0. ISSN 1613-9178. S2CID 28501830.
- Forgó, Ferenc (2010-11-01). "A generalization of correlated equilibrium: A new protocol". Mathematical Social Sciences. 60 (3): 186–190. doi:10.1016/j.mathsocsci.2010.08.002. ISSN 0165-4896.
- Forgó, Ferenc (2011-06-01). "Generalized correlated equilibrium for two-person games in extensive form with perfect information". Central European Journal of Operations Research. 19 (2): 201–213. doi:10.1007/s10100-010-0142-y. ISSN 1613-9178. S2CID 45386551.
- Forgó, Ferenc (2014-03-01). "Measuring the power of soft correlated equilibrium in 2-facility simple non-increasing linear congestion games". Central European Journal of Operations Research. 22 (1): 139–155. doi:10.1007/s10100-012-0279-y. ISSN 1613-9178. S2CID 37469442.
- Forgó, Ferenc (2020-03-01). "Exact enforcement value of soft correlated equilibrium for generalized chicken and prisoner's dilemma games". Central European Journal of Operations Research. 28 (1): 209–227. doi:10.1007/s10100-018-0575-2. ISSN 1613-9178. S2CID 158599227.
- Abaffy, József; Forgó, Ferenc (2020-09-01). "On Random Symmetric Bimatrix Games". International Game Theory Review. 22 (3): 2050002. doi:10.1142/S0219198920500024. ISSN 0219-1989. S2CID 213869178.

== Sources ==
- Budapesti Corvinus Egyetem Staff CV: Dr. Forgó Ferenc.
- Forgó Ferenc. National Doctoral Council. Personal data sheet.
- Forgó Ferenc. MTA Public Boardmembers.
- Tamás Solymosi – József Temesi (Editors): Equilibrium and Optimum, Studies for the 70th birthday of Ferenc Forgó, Aula Kiadó, Budapest, ISBN 978-963-339-018-4,
- WorldCat Identities. Publications of Ferenc Forgó: English 64, German 10, Hungarian 10.
- Who is who, 2000. Biographical lexicon of our contemporaries (editor-in-chief: Péter Hermann), Greger-Biográf, Budapest, 1. 1999, 512.
- Biográf Who is who, 2004. Biographical lexicon of our contemporaries (editor-in-chief: Péter Hermann), Poligráf, Budapest, (A-K) 2003, 500.
