= Guido Zappa =

Italian mathematician (1915–2015)

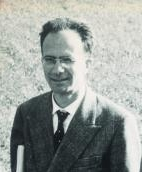
- Zappa in 1961
- Born: 7 December 1915; Naples, Italy
- Died: 17 March 2015 (aged 99); Florence, Italy
- Education: Scuola Normale Superiore
- Known for: Algebraic geometry Group theory
- Scientific career
- Fields: Mathematics
- Workplaces: University of Florence
- Academic advisors: Francesco Severi

Guido Zappa (7 December 1915 – 17 March 2015) was an Italian mathematician and a noted group theorist: his other main research interests were geometry and also the history of mathematics. Zappa was particularly known for some examples of algebraic curves that strongly influenced the ideas of Francesco Severi.

== Life and work ==
=== Honors ===
He was elected ordinary non-resident member of the Accademia Pontaniana on June 16, 1949. On June 3, 1951, he was elected the corresponding member to the class of mathematical sciences of the Società Nazionale di Scienze Lettere e Arti in Napoli: subsequently, he became an ordinary member (2 June 1951) and ordinary non-resident member (15 December 1953). On 14 October 1960 he was elected corresponding member of the Accademia Nazionale dei Lincei: he became national member of the same academy on March 21, 1977.

== Selected publications ==
- Zappa, Guido (1965), Fondamenti di teoria dei gruppi. Volume primo [Fundamentals of group theory. First volume], Monografie matematiche del Consiglio Nazionale delle Ricerche (in Italian), vol. 13, Roma: Edizioni Cremonese, pp. XX+291, MR 0197538, Zbl 0135.03402. This book is the first part of a monograph on group theory, dealing extensively with many of its aspects.
- Zappa, Guido (1970), Fondamenti di teoria dei gruppi. Volume secondo [Fundamentals of group theory. Second volume], Monografie matematiche del Consiglio Nazionale delle Ricerche (in Italian), vol. 18, Rome: Edizioni Cremonese, pp. XXI+411, MR 0258926, Zbl 0201.03001. This book is the second part of a monograph in group theory dealing extensively with many of its aspects.
- Zappa, Guido (1984), "La scuola matematica di Francesco Severi intorno al 1940" [The mathematical school of Francesco Severi around about 1940] (PDF), Rivista di Matematica della Università di Parma, (4) (in Italian), 10^{*}: 11–14, MR 0777309, Zbl 0562.01015. This work describes the research activity at the Sapienza University of Rome and at the (at that time newly created) "Istituto Nazionale di Alta Matematica Francesco Severi" from the end of the 1930s to the early 1940s.

== See also ==
- Algebraic geometry
- Group theory
- Italian school of algebraic geometry
- Francesco Severi
- Zappa-Szép product
