= Derek Taunt =

British mathematician

- Born: 16 November 1917; London, England
- Died: 15 July 2004 (aged 86)
- Education: University of Cambridge
- Scientific career
- Fields: Mathematician
- Workplaces: Bletchley Park; University of Cambridge
- Academic advisors: Philip Hall
- Doctoral students: Roger Carter

Derek Roy Taunt (16 November 1917^{(Note 1)} – 15 July 2004) was a British mathematician who worked as a codebreaker during World War II at Bletchley Park.

Taunt attended Enfield Grammar, then the City of London School. He studied mathematics at Jesus College, Cambridge between 1936 and 1939. He was accepted as a research student by G. H. Hardy, but this was postponed by the outbreak of World War II. Taunt registered with the Joint Recruiting Board, and was initially allocated to work on ballistics at Kemnal Manor in Chislehurst, preparing range tables for new weapons. Finding that the task required only trivial mathematics ("more like advanced arithmetic than real mathematics"), he sought more appropriate work.

In August 1941 he was moved to Bletchley Park and assigned to Hut 6, the section in charge of decrypting German Army and Air Force Enigma signals. While there, he was best man at the marriage of co-workers Bob Roseveare and Ione Jay.

After his wartime work, he returned to Cambridge, and worked on group theory. He was a research student (1945), wrote a doctoral dissertation under Philip Hall, won a Smith's Prize in 1949, and was a Lecturer from 1949 with the honorific title of 'Cayley Lecturer' from 1965 until retirement in 1982. As a Fellow of Jesus College he was at various times a director of studies, tutor, bursar, and from 1979 to 1982 was president. In 1982 he became emeritus Fellow, "with most of the privileges and none of the duties of a Fellow." His doctoral students include Roger Carter.

On 18 December 1952 Taunt was elected a member of the London Mathematical Society. He was married to the English artist Angela Verren with whom he had three children.

== Notes ==
1. The obituary published in the Telegraph gives his birth date as the 16th, while that in the 2004 Jesus College Annual Report incorrectly records it as the 17th. GRO death index gives it as the 16th.

2. Derek Taunt gives an account of his war work in: Hinsley, F.H.; Stripp, Alan (1994). "13: Hut 6 1941-1945". Codebreakers: The inside story of Bletchley Park. OUP. ISBN 0-19-285304-X.
