= Characteristically simple group =

Group without proper nontrivial characteristic subgroups

In mathematics, in the field of group theory, a group is said to be characteristically simple if it has no proper nontrivial characteristic subgroups. Characteristically simple groups are sometimes also termed elementary groups. Characteristically simple is a weaker condition than being a simple group, as simple groups must not have any proper nontrivial normal subgroups, which include characteristic subgroups.

A finite group is characteristically simple if and only if it is a direct product of isomorphic simple groups. In particular, a finite solvable group is characteristically simple if and only if it is an elementary abelian group. This does not hold in general for infinite groups; for example, the rational numbers form a characteristically simple group that is not a direct product of simple groups.

A minimal normal subgroup of a group G is a nontrivial normal subgroup N of G such that the only proper subgroup of N that is normal in G is the trivial subgroup. Every minimal normal subgroup of a group is characteristically simple. This follows from the fact that a characteristic subgroup of a normal subgroup is normal.
