= Perfect core =

In mathematics, in the field of group theory, the perfect core (or perfect radical) of a group is its largest perfect subgroup. Its existence is guaranteed by the fact that the subgroup generated by a family of perfect subgroups is again a perfect subgroup. The perfect core is also the point where the transfinite derived series stabilizes for any group.

A group whose perfect core is trivial is termed a hypoabelian group. Every solvable group is hypoabelian, and so is every free group. More generally, every residually solvable group is hypoabelian.

The quotient of a group G by its perfect core is hypoabelian, and is called the hypoabelianization of G.
