= Subgroup series =

In mathematics, specifically group theory, a subgroup series of a group $G$ is a chain of subgroups:

$$1 = A_0 \leq A_1 \leq \cdots \leq A_n = G$$

where $1$ is the trivial subgroup. Subgroup series can simplify the study of a group to the study of simpler subgroups and their relations, and several subgroup series can be invariantly defined and are important invariants of groups. A subgroup series is used in the subgroup method.

Subgroup series are a special example of the use of filtrations in abstract algebra.

== Definition ==
=== Normal series, subnormal series ===
A subnormal series (also normal series, normal tower, subinvariant series, or just series) of a group G is a sequence of subgroups, each a normal subgroup of the next one. In a standard notation

$$1 = A_0\triangleleft A_1\triangleleft \cdots \triangleleft A_n = G.$$

There is no requirement made that A_{i} be a normal subgroup of G, only a normal subgroup of A_{i +1}. The quotient groups A_{i +1}/A_{i} are called the factor groups of the series.

If in addition each A_{i} is normal in G, then the series is called a normal series, when this term is not used for the weaker sense, or an invariant series.

=== Length ===
A series with the additional property that A_{i} ≠ A_{i +1} for all i is called a series without repetition; equivalently, each A_{i} is a proper subgroup of A_{i +1}. The length of a series is the number of strict inclusions A_{i} < A_{i +1}. If the series has no repetition then the length is n.

For a subnormal series, the length is the number of non-trivial factor groups. Every nontrivial group has a normal series of length 1, namely $1 \triangleleft G$, and any nontrivial proper normal subgroup gives a normal series of length 2. For simple groups, the trivial series of length 1 is the longest subnormal series possible.

=== Ascending series, descending series ===
Series can be notated in either ascending order:

$$1 = A_0\leq A_1\leq \cdots \leq A_n = G$$

or descending order:

$$G = B_0\geq B_1\geq \cdots \geq B_n = 1.$$

For a given finite series, there is no distinction between an "ascending series" or "descending series" beyond notation. For infinite series however, there is a distinction: the ascending series

$$1 = A_0\leq A_1\leq \cdots \leq G$$

has a smallest term, a second smallest term, and so forth, but no largest proper term, no second largest term, and so forth, while conversely the descending series

$$G = B_0\geq B_1\geq \cdots \geq 1$$

has a largest term, but no smallest proper term.

Further, given a recursive formula for producing a series, the terms produced are either ascending or descending, and one calls the resulting series an ascending or descending series, respectively. For instance the derived series and lower central series are descending series, while the upper central series is an ascending series.

=== Noetherian groups, Artinian groups ===
A group that satisfies the ascending chain condition (ACC) on subgroups is called a Noetherian group, and a group that satisfies the descending chain condition (DCC) is called an Artinian group (not to be confused with Artin groups), by analogy with Noetherian rings and Artinian rings. The ACC is equivalent to the maximal condition: every non-empty collection of subgroups has a maximal member, and the DCC is equivalent to the analogous minimal condition.

A group can be Noetherian but not Artinian, such as the infinite cyclic group, and unlike for rings, a group can be Artinian but not Noetherian, such as the Prüfer group. Every finite group is clearly Noetherian and Artinian.

Homomorphic images and subgroups of Noetherian groups are Noetherian, and an extension of a Noetherian group by a Noetherian group is Noetherian. Analogous results hold for Artinian groups.

Noetherian groups are equivalently those such that every subgroup is finitely generated, which is stronger than the group itself being finitely generated: the free group on 2 or finitely more generators is finitely generated, but contains free groups of infinite rank.

Noetherian groups need not be finite extensions of polycyclic groups.

=== Infinite and transfinite series ===
Infinite subgroup series can also be defined and arise naturally, in which case the specific (totally ordered) indexing set becomes important, and there is a distinction between ascending and descending series. An ascending series $1 = A_0\leq A_1\leq \cdots \leq G$ where the $A_i$ are indexed by the natural numbers may simply be called an infinite ascending series, and conversely for an infinite descending series. If the subgroups are more generally indexed by ordinal numbers, one obtains a transfinite series, such as this ascending series:

$$1 = A_0\leq A_1\leq \cdots \leq A_\omega \leq A_{\omega+1} = G$$

Given a recursive formula for producing a series, one can define a transfinite series by transfinite recursion by defining the series at limit ordinals by $A_\lambda := \bigcup_{\alpha < \lambda} A_\alpha$ (for ascending series) or $A_\lambda := \bigcap_{\alpha < \lambda} A_\alpha$ (for descending series). Fundamental examples of this construction are the transfinite lower central series and upper central series.

Other totally ordered sets arise rarely, if ever, as indexing sets of subgroup series. For instance, one can define but rarely sees naturally occurring bi-infinite subgroup series (series indexed by the integers):

$$1 \leq \cdots \leq A_{-1} \leq A_0\leq A_1 \leq \cdots \leq G$$

== Comparison of series ==
A refinement of a series is another series containing each of the terms of the original series. Two subnormal series are said to be equivalent or isomorphic if there is a bijection between the sets of their factor groups such that the corresponding factor groups are isomorphic. Refinement gives a partial order on series, up to equivalence, and they form a lattice, while subnormal series and normal series form sublattices. The existence of the supremum of two subnormal series is the Schreier refinement theorem. Of particular interest are maximal series without repetition.

== Examples ==
=== Maximal series ===
- A composition series is a maximal subnormal series.

Equivalently, a subnormal series for which each of the A_{i} is a maximal normal subgroup of A_{i +1}. Equivalently, a composition series is a subnormal series for which each of the factor groups are simple.

- A chief series is a maximal normal series.

=== Solvable and nilpotent ===
- A solvable group, or soluble group, is one with a subnormal series whose factor groups are all abelian.
- A nilpotent series is a subnormal series such that successive quotients are nilpotent.

A nilpotent series exists if and only if the group is solvable.

- A central series is a subnormal series such that successive quotients are central, i.e. given the above series, $A_{i+1}/A_i \subseteq Z(G/A_i)$ for $i=0, 1, \ldots, n-2$.

A central series exists if and only if the group is nilpotent.

=== Functional series ===
Some subgroup series are defined functionally, in terms of subgroups such as the center and operations such as the commutator. These include:

- Lower central series
- Upper central series
- Derived series
- Lower Fitting series
- Upper Fitting series

=== p-series ===
There are series coming from subgroups of prime power order or prime power index, related to ideas such as Sylow subgroups.

- Lower p-series
- Upper p-series

== Subgroup method ==
The subgroup method is an algorithm used in the mathematical field of group theory. It is used to find the word of an element. It doesn't always return the minimal word, but it can return optimal words based on the series of subgroups that is used. The code looks like this:

function operate(element, generator)
    <returns generator operated on element>

function subgroup(g)
    sequence := (set of subgroups that will be used, depending on the method.)
    word := []
    for subgroup in sequence
        coset_representatives := []
        <fill coset_representatives with coset representatives of (next subgroup)/subgroup>
        for operation in coset_representatives
            if operate(g, operation) is in the next subgroup then
                append operation onto word
                g = operate(g, operation)
                break
    return word
