= Power automorphism =

In mathematics, in the realm of group theory, a power automorphism of a group is an automorphism that takes each subgroup of the group to within itself. The power automorphism of an infinite group may not restrict to an automorphism on each subgroup. For instance, the automorphism on rational numbers that sends each number to its double is a power automorphism even though it does not restrict to an automorphism on each subgroup.

Alternatively, power automorphisms are characterized as automorphisms that send each element of the group to some power of that element. This explains the choice of the term power. The power automorphisms of a group form a sub-semigroup of the whole automorphism group. This sub-semigroup is denoted as $Pot(G)$ where $G$ is the group.

A universal power automorphism is a power automorphism where the power to which each element is raised is the same. For instance, each element may go to its cube. Here are some facts about the powering index:

- The powering index must be relatively prime to the order of each element. In particular, it must be relatively prime to the order of the group, if the group is finite.
- If the group is abelian, any powering index works.
- If the powering index 2 or -1 works, then the group is abelian.

The semigroup of power automorphisms commutes with the group of inner automorphisms when viewed as sub-semigroups of the automorphism group. Thus, in particular, power automorphisms that are also inner must arise as conjugations by elements in the second group of the upper central series.
