= Composition series =

Decomposition of an algebraic structure

In abstract algebra, a composition series provides a way to break up an algebraic structure, such as a group or a module, into simple pieces. The need for considering composition series in the context of modules arises from the fact that many naturally occurring modules are not semisimple, hence cannot be decomposed into a direct sum of simple modules. A composition series of a module M is a finite increasing filtration of M by submodules such that the successive quotients are simple and serves as a replacement of the direct sum decomposition of M into its simple constituents.

A composition series may not exist, and when it does, it need not be unique. Nevertheless, a group of results known under the general name Jordan–Hölder theorem asserts that whenever composition series exist, the isomorphism classes of simple pieces (although, perhaps, not their location in the composition series in question) and their multiplicities are uniquely determined. Composition series may thus be used to define invariants of finite groups and Artinian modules.

A related but distinct concept is a chief series: a composition series is a maximal subnormal series, while a chief series is a maximal normal series.

== For groups ==
If a group G has a normal subgroup N, then the factor group G/N may be formed, and some aspects of the study of the structure of G may be broken down by studying the "smaller" groups G/N and N. If G has no normal subgroup that is different from G and from the trivial group, then G is a simple group. Otherwise, the question naturally arises as to whether G can be reduced to simple "pieces", and if so, whether there are any unique features of the way this can be done.

More formally, a composition series of a group G is a subnormal series of finite length

$$1 = H_0\triangleleft H_1\triangleleft \cdots \triangleleft H_n = G,$$

with strict inclusions, such that each H_{i} is a maximal proper normal subgroup of H_{i+1}. Equivalently, a composition series is a subnormal series such that each factor group H_{i+1} / H_{i} is simple. The factor groups are called composition factors.

A subnormal series is a composition series if and only if it is of maximal length. That is, there are no additional subgroups which can be "inserted" into a composition series. The length n of the series is called the composition length.

If a composition series exists for a group G, then any subnormal series of G can be refined to a composition series, informally, by inserting subgroups into the series up to maximality. Every finite group has a composition series, but not every infinite group has one. For example, $\mathbb{Z}$ has no composition series.

=== Uniqueness: Jordan–Hölder theorem ===
A group may have more than one composition series. However, the Jordan–Hölder theorem (named after Camille Jordan and Otto Hölder) states that any two composition series of a given group are equivalent. That is, they have the same composition length and the same composition factors, up to permutation and isomorphism. This theorem can be proved using the Schreier refinement theorem. The Jordan–Hölder theorem is also true for transfinite ascending composition series, but not transfinite descending composition series (Birkhoff 1934). Baumslag (2006) gives a short proof of the Jordan–Hölder theorem by intersecting the terms in one subnormal series with those in the other series.

==== Example ====
For a cyclic group of order n, composition series correspond to ordered prime factorizations of n, and in fact yields a proof of the fundamental theorem of arithmetic.

For example, the cyclic group $C_{12}$ has $C_1\triangleleft C_2\triangleleft C_6 \triangleleft C_{12}, \ \, C_1\triangleleft C_2\triangleleft C_4\triangleleft C_{12},$ and $C_1\triangleleft C_3\triangleleft C_6 \triangleleft C_{12}$ as three different composition series. The sequences of composition factors obtained in the respective cases are $C_2,C_3,C_2, \ \, C_2,C_2,C_3,$ and $C_3,C_2,C_2.$

== For modules ==
The definition of composition series for modules restricts all attention to submodules, ignoring all additive subgroups that are not submodules. Given a ring R and an R-module M, a composition series for M is a series of submodules

$$\{0\} = J_0 \subset \cdots \subset J_n = M$$

where all inclusions are strict and J_{k} is a maximal submodule of J_{k+1} for each k. As for groups, if M has a composition series at all, then any finite strictly increasing series of submodules of M may be refined to a composition series, and any two composition series for M are equivalent. In that case, the (simple) quotient modules J_{k+1}/J_{k} are known as the composition factors of M, and the Jordan–Hölder theorem holds, ensuring that the number of occurrences of each isomorphism type of simple R-module as a composition factor does not depend on the choice of composition series.

It is well known that a module has a finite composition series if and only if it is both an Artinian module and a Noetherian module. If R is an Artinian ring, then every finitely generated R-module is Artinian and Noetherian, and thus has a finite composition series. In particular, for any field K, any finite-dimensional module for a finite-dimensional algebra over K has a composition series, unique up to equivalence.

== Generalization ==
Groups with a set of operators generalize group actions and ring actions on a group. A unified approach to both groups and modules can be followed as in (Bourbaki 1974, Ch. 1) or (Isaacs 1994, Ch. 10), simplifying some of the exposition. The group G is viewed as being acted upon by elements (operators) from a set Ω. Attention is restricted entirely to subgroups invariant under the action of elements from Ω, called Ω-subgroups. Thus Ω-composition series must use only Ω-subgroups, and Ω-composition factors need only be Ω-simple. The standard results above, such as the Jordan–Hölder theorem, are established with nearly identical proofs.

The special cases recovered include when Ω = G so that G is acting on itself. An important example of this is when elements of G act by conjugation, so that the set of operators consists of the inner automorphisms. A composition series under this action is exactly a chief series. Module structures are a case of Ω-actions where Ω is a ring and some additional axioms are satisfied.

== For objects in an abelian category ==
A composition series of an object A in an abelian category is a sequence of subobjects

$$A=X_0\supsetneq X_1\supsetneq \dots \supsetneq X_n=0$$

such that each quotient object X_{i} /X_{i + 1} is simple (for 0 ≤ i < n). If A has a composition series, the integer n only depends on A and is called the length of A.

== See also ==
- Krohn–Rhodes theory, a semigroup analogue
- Schreier refinement theorem, any two subnormal series have equivalent composition series refinements
- Zassenhaus lemma, used to prove the Schreier Refinement Theorem
