= Hall subgroup =

In mathematics, specifically group theory, a Hall subgroup of a finite group G is a subgroup whose order is coprime to its index. They were introduced by the group theorist Philip Hall (1928).

== Definitions ==
A Hall divisor (also called a unitary divisor) of an integer n is a divisor d of n such that d and n/d are coprime. The easiest way to find the Hall divisors is to write the prime power factorization of the number in question and take any subset of the factors. For example, to find the Hall divisors of 60, its prime power factorization is 2^{2} × 3 × 5, so one takes any product of 3, 2^{2} = 4, and 5. Thus, the Hall divisors of 60 are 1, 3, 4, 5, 12, 15, 20, and 60.

A Hall subgroup of G is a subgroup whose order is a Hall divisor of the order of G. In other words, it is a subgroup whose order is coprime to its index.

If π is a set of primes, then a Hall π-subgroup is a subgroup whose order is a product of primes in π, and whose index is not divisible by any primes in π.

== Examples ==
- Any Sylow subgroup of a group is a Hall subgroup.
- The alternating group A_{4} of order 12 is solvable but has no subgroups of order 6 even though 6 divides 12, showing that Hall's theorem (see below) cannot be extended to all divisors of the order of a solvable group.
- If G = A_{5}, the only simple group of order 60, then 15 and 20 are Hall divisors of the order of G, but G has no subgroups of these orders.
- The simple group of order 168 has two different conjugacy classes of Hall subgroups of order 24 (though they are connected by an outer automorphism of G).
- The simple group of order 660 has two Hall subgroups of order 12 that are not even isomorphic (and so certainly not conjugate, even under an outer automorphism). The normalizer of a Sylow 2-subgroup of order 4 is isomorphic to the alternating group A_{4} of order 12, while the normalizer of a subgroup of order 2 or 3 is isomorphic to the dihedral group of order 12.

== Hall's theorem ==
Hall (1928) proved that if G is a finite solvable group and π is any set of primes, then G has a Hall π-subgroup, and any two Hall π-subgroups are conjugate. Moreover, any subgroup whose order is a product of primes in π is contained in some Hall π-subgroup. This result can be thought of as a generalization of Sylow's Theorem to Hall subgroups, but the examples above show that such a generalization is false when the group is not solvable.

The existence of Hall subgroups can be proved by induction on the order of G, using the fact that every finite solvable group has a normal elementary abelian subgroup. More precisely, fix a minimal normal subgroup A, which is either a π-group or a π′-group as G is π-separable. By induction there is a subgroup H of G containing A such that H/A is a Hall π-subgroup of G/A. If A is a π-group then H is a Hall π-subgroup of G. On the other hand, if A is a π′-group, then by the Schur–Zassenhaus theorem A has a complement in H, which is a Hall π-subgroup of G.

== A converse to Hall's theorem ==
Any finite group that has a Hall π-subgroup for every set of primes π is solvable. This is a generalization of Burnside's theorem that any group whose order is of the form p^{a}q^{b} for primes p and q is solvable, because Sylow's theorem implies that all Hall subgroups exist. This does not (at present) give another proof of Burnside's theorem, because Burnside's theorem is used to prove this converse.

== Sylow systems ==
A Sylow system is a set of Sylow p-subgroups S_{p} for each prime p such that S_{p}S_{q} = S_{q}S_{p} for all p and q. If we have a Sylow system, then the subgroup generated by the groups S_{p} for p in π is a Hall π-subgroup. A more precise version of Hall's theorem says that any solvable group has a Sylow system, and any two Sylow systems are conjugate.

== Normal Hall subgroups ==
Any normal Hall subgroup H of a finite group G possesses a complement, that is, there is some subgroup K of G that intersects H trivially and such that HK = G (so G is a semidirect product of H and K). This is the Schur–Zassenhaus theorem.

== See also ==
- Formation
