= Commutator subgroup =

Smallest normal subgroup by which the quotient is commutative

In mathematics, more specifically in abstract algebra, the commutator subgroup or derived subgroup of a group is the subgroup generated by all the commutators of the group.

The commutator subgroup is important because it is the smallest normal subgroup such that the quotient group of the original group by this subgroup is abelian. In other words, $G/N$ is abelian if and only if $N$ contains the commutator subgroup of $G$. So in some sense it provides a measure of how far the group is from being abelian; the larger the commutator subgroup is, the "less abelian" the group is.

== Commutators ==
For elements $g$ and $h$ of a group G, the commutator of $g$ and $h$ is $[g,h] = g^{-1}h^{-1}gh$. The commutator $[g,h]$ is equal to the identity element e if and only if $gh = hg$ , that is, if and only if $g$ and $h$ commute. In general, $gh = hg[g,h]$.

However, the notation is somewhat arbitrary and there is a non-equivalent variant definition for the commutator that has the inverses on the right hand side of the equation: $[g,h] = ghg^{-1}h^{-1}$ in which case $gh \neq hg[g,h]$ but instead $gh = [g,h]hg$.

An element of G of the form $[g,h]$ for some g and h is called a commutator. The identity element e = [e,e] is always a commutator, and it is the only commutator if and only if G is abelian.

Here are some simple but useful commutator identities, true for any elements s, g, h of a group G:

- $[g,h]^{-1} = [h,g],$
- $[g,h]^s = [g^s,h^s],$ where $g^s = s^{-1}gs$ (or, respectively, $g^s = sgs^{-1}$) is the conjugate of $g$ by $s,$
- for any homomorphism $f: G \to H$, $f([g, h]) = [f(g), f(h)].$

The first and second identities imply that the set of commutators in G is closed under inversion and conjugation. If in the third identity we take H = G, we get that the set of commutators is stable under any endomorphism of G. This is in fact a generalization of the second identity, since we can take f to be the conjugation automorphism on G, $x \mapsto x^s$, to get the second identity.

However, the product of two or more commutators need not be a commutator. A generic example is [a,b][c,d] in the free group on a,b,c,d. It is known that the least order of a finite group for which there exists two commutators whose product is not a commutator is 96; in fact there are two nonisomorphic groups of order 96 with this property.

== Definition ==
This motivates the definition of the commutator subgroup $[G, G]$ (also called the derived subgroup, and denoted $G'$ or $G^{(1)}$) of G: it is the subgroup generated by all the commutators.

It follows from this definition that any element of $[G, G]$ is of the form

$$[g_1,h_1] \cdots [g_n,h_n]$$

for some natural number $n$, where the g_{i} and h_{i} are elements of G. Moreover, since $([g_1,h_1] \cdots [g_n,h_n])^s = [g_1^s,h_1^s] \cdots [g_n^s,h_n^s]$, the commutator subgroup is normal in G. For any homomorphism f: G → H,

$$f([g_1,h_1] \cdots [g_n,h_n]) = [f(g_1),f(h_1)] \cdots [f(g_n),f(h_n)]$$,

so that $f([G,G]) \subseteq [H,H]$.

This shows that the commutator subgroup can be viewed as a functor on the category of groups, some implications of which are explored below. Moreover, taking G = H it shows that the commutator subgroup is stable under every endomorphism of G: that is, [G,G] is a fully characteristic subgroup of G, a property considerably stronger than normality.

The commutator subgroup can also be defined as the set of elements g of the group that have an expression as a product g = g_{1} g_{2} ... g_{k} that can be rearranged to give the identity.

=== Derived series ===
This construction can be iterated:

$$G^{(0)} := G$$
$$G^{(n)} := [G^{(n-1)},G^{(n-1)}] \quad n \in \mathbf{N}$$

The groups $G^{(2)}, G^{(3)}, \ldots$ are called the second derived subgroup, third derived subgroup, and so forth, and the descending normal series

$$\cdots \triangleleft G^{(2)} \triangleleft G^{(1)} \triangleleft G^{(0)} = G$$

is called the derived series. This should not be confused with the lower central series, whose terms are $G_n := [G_{n-1},G]$.

For a finite group, the derived series terminates in a perfect group, which may or may not be trivial. For an infinite group, the derived series need not terminate at a finite stage, and one can continue it to infinite ordinal numbers via transfinite recursion, thereby obtaining the transfinite derived series, which eventually terminates at the perfect core of the group.

=== Abelianization ===
Given a group $G$, a quotient group $G/N$ is abelian if and only if $[G, G]\subseteq N$.

The quotient $G/[G, G]$ is an abelian group called the abelianization of $G$ or $G$ made abelian. It is usually denoted by $G^{\operatorname{ab}}$ or $G_{\operatorname{ab}}$.

There is a useful categorical interpretation of the map $\varphi: G \rightarrow G^{\operatorname{ab}}$. Namely $\varphi$ is universal for homomorphisms from $G$ to an abelian group $H$: for any abelian group $H$ and homomorphism of groups $f: G \to H$ there exists a unique homomorphism $F: G^{\operatorname{ab}}\to H$ such that $f = F \circ \varphi$. As usual for objects defined by universal mapping properties, this shows the uniqueness of the abelianization $G^{\operatorname{ab}}$ up to canonical isomorphism, whereas the explicit construction $G\to G/[G, G]$ shows existence.

The abelianization functor is the left adjoint of the inclusion functor from the category of abelian groups to the category of groups. The existence of the abelianization functor Grp → Ab makes the category Ab a reflective subcategory of the category of groups, defined as a full subcategory whose inclusion functor has a left adjoint.

Another important interpretation of $G^{\operatorname{ab}}$ is as $H_1(G, \mathbb{Z})$, the first homology group of $G$ with integral coefficients.

=== Classes of groups ===
A group $G$ is an abelian group if and only if the derived group is trivial: [G,G] = {e}. Equivalently, if and only if the group equals its abelianization. See above for the definition of a group's abelianization.

A group $G$ is a perfect group if and only if the derived group equals the group itself: [G,G] = G. Equivalently, if and only if the abelianization of the group is trivial. This is, in a sense, the opposite of being abelian.

A group with $G^{(n)}=\{e\}$ for some n in N is called a solvable group; this is weaker than abelian, which is the case n = 1.

A group with $G^{(n)} \neq \{e\}$ for all n in N is called a non-solvable group.

A group with $G^{(\alpha)}=\{e\}$ for some ordinal number, possibly infinite, is called a hypoabelian group; this is weaker than solvable, which is the case α is finite (a natural number).

=== Perfect group ===
Whenever a group $G$ has derived subgroup equal to itself, $G^{(1)} =G$, it is called a perfect group. This includes non-abelian simple groups and the special linear groups $\operatorname{SL}_n(k)$ for a fixed field $k$.

== Examples ==
- The commutator subgroup of any abelian group is trivial.
- The commutator subgroup of the general linear group $\operatorname{GL}_n(k)$ over a field or a division ring k equals the special linear group $\operatorname{SL}_n(k)$ provided that $n \ne 2$ or k is not the field with two elements.
- The commutator subgroup of the alternating group A_{4} is the Klein four group.
- The commutator subgroup of the symmetric group S_{n} is the alternating group A_{n}.
- The commutator subgroup of the quaternion group Q = {1, −1, i, −i, j, −j, k, −k} is [Q,Q] = {1, −1}.

=== Map from Out ===
Since the derived subgroup is characteristic, any automorphism of G induces an automorphism of the abelianization. Since the abelianization is abelian, inner automorphisms act trivially, hence this yields a map

$$\operatorname{Out}(G) \to \operatorname{Aut}(G^{\mbox{ab}})$$

== See also ==
- Solvable group
- Nilpotent group
- The abelianization H/H' of a subgroup H < G of finite index (G:H) is the target of the Artin transfer T(G,H).
