= Omega and agemo subgroup =

Concept in mathematics

In mathematics, or more specifically group theory, the omega and agemo subgroups described the so-called "power structure" of a finite p-group. They were introduced in (Hall 1933) where they were used to describe a class of finite p-groups whose structure was sufficiently similar to that of finite abelian p-groups, the so-called, regular p-groups. The relationship between power and commutator structure forms a central theme in the modern study of p-groups, as exemplified in the work on uniformly powerful p-groups.

The word "agemo" is just "omega" spelled backwards, and the agemo subgroup is denoted by an upside-down omega (℧).

== Definition ==
The omega subgroups are the series of subgroups of a finite p-group, G, indexed by the natural numbers:

$\Omega_i(G) = \langle \{g\in G : g^{p^i} = 1 \} \rangle.$

The agemo subgroups are the series of subgroups:

$\mho^i(G) = \langle \{ g^{p^i} : g \in G \} \rangle.$

When i = 1 and p is odd, then i is normally omitted from the definition. When p is even, an omitted i may mean either i = 1 or i = 2 depending on local convention. In this article, we use the convention that an omitted i always indicates i = 1.

== Examples ==
The dihedral group of order 8, G, satisfies: ℧(G) = Z(G) = [ G, G ] = Φ(G) = Soc(G) is the unique normal subgroup of order 2, typically realized as the subgroup containing the identity and a 180° rotation. However Ω(G) = G is the entire group, since G is generated by reflections. This shows that Ω(G) need not be the set of elements of order p.

The quaternion group of order 8, H, satisfies Ω(H) = ℧(H) = Z(H) = [ H, H ] = Φ(H) = Soc(H) is the unique subgroup of order 2, normally realized as the subgroup containing only 1 and −1.

The Sylow p-subgroup, P, of the symmetric group on p^{2} points is the wreath product of two cyclic groups of prime order. When p = 2, this is just the dihedral group of order 8. It too satisfies Ω(P) = P. Again ℧(P) = Z(P) = Soc(P) is cyclic of order p, but [ P, P ] = Φ(G) is elementary abelian of order p^{p−1}.

The semidirect product of a cyclic group of order 4 acting non-trivially on a cyclic group of order 4,

$$K = \langle a,b : a^4 = b^4 = 1, ba=ab^3 \rangle,$$

has ℧(K) elementary abelian of order 4, but the set of squares is simply { 1, aa, bb }. Here the element aabb of ℧(K) is not a square, showing that ℧ is not simply the set of squares.

== Properties ==
In this section, let G be a finite p-group of order |G| = p^{n} and exponent exp(G) = p^{k}. Then the omega and agemo families satisfy a number of useful properties.

General properties

- Both Ω_{i}(G) and ℧^{i}(G) are characteristic subgroups of G for all natural numbers, i.
- The omega and agemo subgroups form two normal series:

G = ℧^{0}(G) ≥ ℧^{1}(G) ≥ ℧^{2}(G) ≥ ... ≥ ℧^{k−2}(G) ≥ ℧^{k−1}(G) > ℧^{k}(G) = 1
G = Ω_{k}(G) ≥ Ω_{k−1}(G) ≥ Ω_{k−2}(G) ≥ ... ≥ Ω_{2}(G) ≥ Ω_{1}(G) > Ω_{0}(G) = 1

and the series are loosely intertwined: For all i between 1 and k:

℧^{i}(G) ≤ Ω_{k−i}(G), but
℧^{i−1}(G) is not contained in Ω_{k−i}(G).

Behavior under quotients and subgroups

If H ≤ G is a subgroup of G and N ⊲ G is a normal subgroup of G, then:

- ℧^{i}(H) ≤ H ∩ ℧^{i}(G)
- ℧^{i}(N) ⊲ G
- Ω_{i}(N) ⊲ G
- ℧^{i}(G/N) = ℧^{i}(G)N/N
- Ω_{i}(G/N) ≥ Ω_{i}(G)N/N

Relation to other important subgroups

- Soc(G) = Ω(Z(G)), the subgroup consisting of central elements of order p is the socle, Soc(G), of G
- Φ(G) = ℧(G)[G,G], the subgroup generated by all pth powers and commutators is the Frattini subgroup, Φ(G), of G.

Relations in special classes of groups

- In an abelian p-group, or more generally in a regular p-group:

|℧^{i}(G)|⋅|Ω_{i}(G)| = |G|
[℧^{i}(G):℧^{i+1}(G)] = [Ω_{i}(G):Ω_{i+1}(G)],

where |H| is the order of H and [H:K] = |H|/|K| denotes the index of the subgroups K ≤ H.

== Applications ==
The first application of the omega and agemo subgroups was to draw out the analogy of regular p-groups with abelian p-groups in (Hall 1933).

Groups in which Ω(G) ≤ Z(G) were studied by John G. Thompson and have seen several more recent applications.

The dual notion, groups with [G,G] ≤ ℧(G) are called powerful p-groups and were introduced by Avinoam Mann. These groups were critical for the proof of the coclass conjectures which introduced an important way to understand the structure and classification of finite p-groups.
