= Inner automorphism =

Term in abstract algebra

In abstract algebra, an inner automorphism is an automorphism of a group, ring, or algebra given by the conjugation action of a fixed element, called the conjugating element. They can be realized via operations from within the group itself, hence the adjective "inner". These inner automorphisms form a subgroup of the automorphism group, and the quotient of the automorphism group by this subgroup is defined as the outer automorphism group.

== Definition ==
If G is a group and g is an element of G (alternatively, if G is a ring, and g is a unit), then the function

$$\begin{align}
\varphi_g\colon G&\to G \\
\varphi_g(x)&:= g^{-1}xg
\end{align}$$

is called (right) conjugation by g (see also conjugacy class). This function is an endomorphism of G: for all $x_1,x_2\in G,$

$$\varphi_g(x_1 x_2) = g^{-1} x_1 x_2g = g^{-1} x_1 \left(g g^{-1}\right) x_2 g = \left(g^{-1} x_1 g\right)\left(g^{-1} x_2 g\right) = \varphi_g(x_1)\varphi_g(x_2),$$

where the second equality is given by the insertion of the identity between $x_1$ and $x_2$. Furthermore, it has a left and right inverse, namely $\varphi_{g^{-1}}$. Thus, $\varphi_g$ is both a monomorphism and epimorphism, and so an isomorphism of G with itself, i.e. an automorphism. An inner automorphism is any automorphism that arises from conjugation.

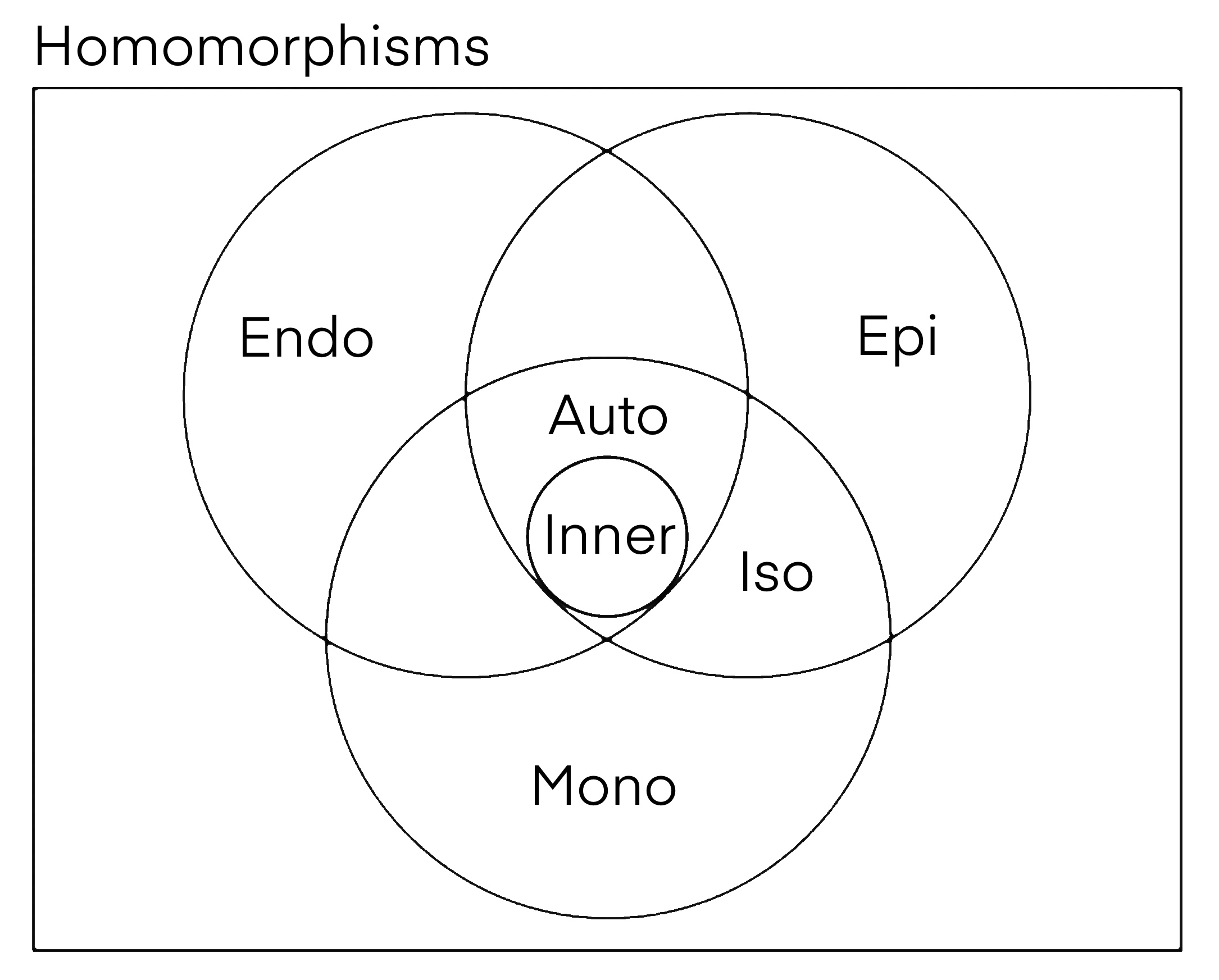
General relationship between various group homomorphisms

When discussing right conjugation, the expression $g^{-1}xg$ is often denoted exponentially by $x^g$. This notation is used because composition of conjugations satisfies the identity: $\left(x^{g_1}\right)^{g_2} = x^{g_1g_2}$ for all $g_1, g_2 \in G$. This shows that right conjugation gives a right action of G on itself.

A common example is as follows:

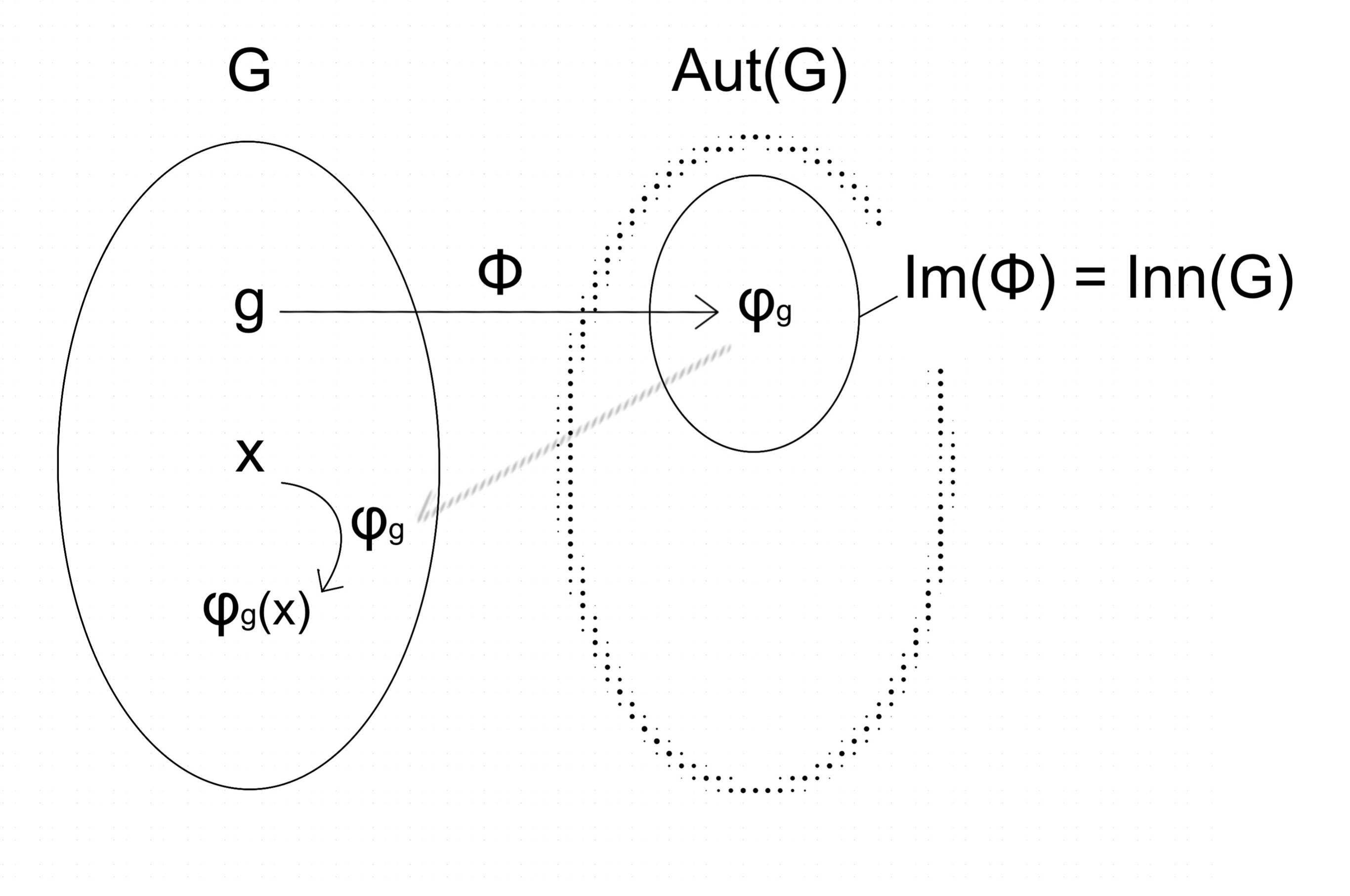
Relationship of morphisms and elements

Describe a homomorphism $\Phi$ for which the image, $\text{Im} (\Phi)$, is a normal subgroup of inner automorphisms of a group $G$; alternatively, describe a natural homomorphism of which the kernel of $\Phi$ is the center of $G$ (all $g \in G$ for which conjugating by them returns the trivial automorphism), in other words, $\text{Ker} (\Phi) = \text{Z}(G)$. There is always a natural homomorphism $\Phi : G \to \text{Aut}(G)$, which associates to every $g \in G$ an (inner) automorphism $\varphi_{g}$ in $\text{Aut}(G)$. Put identically, $\Phi : g \mapsto \varphi_{g}$.

Let $\varphi_{g}(x) := gxg^{-1}$ as defined above. This requires demonstrating that (1) $\varphi_{g}$ is a homomorphism, (2) $\varphi_{g}$ is also a bijection, (3) $\Phi$ is a homomorphism.

1. $\varphi_{g}(xx')=gxx'g^{-1} =gx(g^{-1}g)x'g^{-1} = (gxg^{-1})(gx'g^{-1}) = \varphi_{g}(x)\varphi_{g}(x')$
2. The condition for bijectivity may be verified by simply presenting an inverse such that we can return to $x$ from $gxg^{-1}$. In this case it is conjugation by $g^{-1}$denoted as $\varphi_{g^{-1}}$.
3. $\Phi(gg')(x)=(gg')x(gg')^{-1}$ and $\Phi(g)\circ \Phi(g')(x)=\Phi(g) \circ (g'xg'^{-1}) = gg'xg'^{-1}g^{-1} = (gg')x(gg')^{-1}$

== Inner and outer automorphism groups ==
The composition of two inner automorphisms is again an inner automorphism, and with this operation, the collection of all inner automorphisms of G is a group, the inner automorphism group of G denoted Inn(G).

Inn(G) is a normal subgroup of the full automorphism group Aut(G) of G. The outer automorphism group, Out(G) is the quotient group
$$\operatorname{Out}(G) = \operatorname{Aut}(G) / \operatorname{Inn}(G).$$

The outer automorphism group measures, in a sense, how many automorphisms of G are not inner. Every non-inner automorphism yields a non-trivial element of Out(G), but different non-inner automorphisms may yield the same element of Out(G).

Saying that conjugation of x by a leaves x unchanged is equivalent to saying that a and x commute:
$$a^{-1}xa = x \iff xa = ax$$

Therefore the existence and number of inner automorphisms that are not the identity mapping is a kind of measure of the failure of the commutative law in the group (or ring).

An automorphism of a group G is inner if and only if it extends to every group containing G.

By associating the element a ∈ G with the inner automorphism f(x) = x^{a} in Inn(G) as above, one obtains an isomorphism between the quotient group G / Z(G) (where Z(G) is the center of G) and the inner automorphism group:
$$G\,/\,\mathrm{Z}(G) \cong \operatorname{Inn}(G)$$

This is a consequence of the first isomorphism theorem, because Z(G) is precisely the set of those elements of G that give the identity mapping as corresponding inner automorphism (conjugation changes nothing).

=== Non-inner automorphisms of finite p-groups ===
A result of Wolfgang Gaschütz says that if G is a finite non-abelian p-group, then G has an automorphism of p-power order which is not inner.

It is an open problem whether every non-abelian p-group G has an automorphism of order p. The latter question has positive answer whenever G has one of the following conditions:

1. G is nilpotent of class 2
2. G is a regular p-group
3. G / Z(G) is a powerful p-group
4. The centralizer in G, C_{G}, of the center, Z, of the Frattini subgroup, Φ, of G, C_{G} ∘ Z ∘ Φ(G), is not equal to Φ(G)

=== Types of groups ===
The inner automorphism group of a group G, Inn(G), is trivial (i.e., consists only of the identity element) if and only if G is abelian.

The group Inn(G) is cyclic only when it is trivial.

At the opposite end of the spectrum, the inner automorphisms may exhaust the entire automorphism group; a group whose automorphisms are all inner and whose center is trivial is called complete. This is the case for all of the symmetric groups on n elements when n is not 2 or 6. When n = 6, the symmetric group has a unique non-trivial class of non-inner automorphisms, and when n = 2, the symmetric group, despite having no non-inner automorphisms, is abelian, giving a non-trivial center, disqualifying it from being complete.

If the inner automorphism group of a perfect group G is simple, then G is called quasisimple.

== Lie algebra case ==
An automorphism of a Lie algebra 𝔊 is called an inner automorphism if it is of the form Ad_{g}, where Ad is the adjoint map and g is an element of a Lie group whose Lie algebra is 𝔊. The notion of inner automorphism for Lie algebras is compatible with the notion for groups in the sense that an inner automorphism of a Lie group induces a unique inner automorphism of the corresponding Lie algebra.

== Extension ==
If G is the group of units of a ring, A, then an inner automorphism on G can be extended to a mapping on the projective line over A by the group of units of the matrix ring, M_{2}(A). In particular, the inner automorphisms of the classical groups can be extended in that way.
