= Regular p-group =

In mathematical finite group theory, the concept of regular p-group captures some of the more important properties of abelian p-groups, but is general enough to include most "small" p-groups. Regular p-groups were introduced by Phillip Hall (1934).

== Definition ==
A finite p-group G is said to be regular if any of the following equivalent (Hall 1959, Ch. 12.4), (Huppert 1967, Kap. III §10) conditions are satisfied:

- For every a, b in G, there is a c in the derived subgroup H′ of the subgroup H of G generated by a and b, such that a^{p} · b^{p} = (ab)^{p} · c^{p}.
- For every a, b in G, there are elements c_{i} in the derived subgroup of the subgroup generated by a and b, such that a^{p} · b^{p} = (ab)^{p} · c_{1}^{p} ⋯ c_{k}^{p}.
- For every a, b in G and every positive integer n, there are elements c_{i} in the derived subgroup of the subgroup generated by a and b such that a^{q} · b^{q} = (ab)^{q} · c_{1}^{q} ⋯ c_{k}^{q}, where q = p^{n}.

== Examples ==
Many familiar p-groups are regular:

- Every abelian p-group is regular.
- Every p-group of nilpotency class strictly less than p is regular. This follows from the Hall–Petresco identity.
- Every p-group of order at most p^{p} is regular.
- Every finite group of exponent p is regular.

However, many familiar p-groups are not regular:

- Every nonabelian 2-group is irregular.
- The Sylow p-subgroup of the symmetric group on p^{2} points is irregular and of order p^{p+1}.

== Properties ==
A p-group is regular if and only if every subgroup generated by two elements is regular.

Every subgroup and quotient group of a regular group is regular, but the direct product of regular groups need not be regular.

A 2-group is regular if and only if it is abelian. A 3-group with two generators is regular if and only if its derived subgroup is cyclic. Every p-group of odd order with cyclic derived subgroup is regular.

The subgroup of a p-group G generated by the elements of order dividing p^{k} is denoted Ω_{k}(G) and regular groups are well-behaved in that Ω_{k}(G) is precisely the set of elements of order dividing p^{k}. The subgroup generated by all p^{k}-th powers of elements in G is denoted ℧_{k}(G). In a regular group, the index [G:℧_{k}(G)] is equal to the order of Ω_{k}(G). In fact, commutators and powers interact in particularly simple ways (Huppert 1967, Kap III §10, Satz 10.8). For example, given normal subgroups M and N of a regular p-group G and nonnegative integers m and n, one has [℧_{m}(M),℧_{n}(N)] = ℧_{m+n}([M,N]).

- Philip Hall's criteria of regularity of a p-group G: G is regular, if one of the following hold:
  1. [G:℧_{1}(G)] < p^{p}
  2. [G′:℧_{1}(G′)| < p^{p−1}
  3. |Ω_{1}(G)| < p^{p−1}

== Generalizations ==
- Powerful p-group
- power closed p-group
