= Group of symplectic type =

In mathematics, specifically finite group theory, a p-group of symplectic type is a p-group such that all characteristic abelian subgroups are cyclic.

According to Thompson (1968, p.386), the p-groups of symplectic type were classified by P. Hall in unpublished lecture notes, who showed that they are all a central product of an extraspecial group with a group that is cyclic, dihedral, quasidihedral, or quaternion. Gorenstein (1980, 5.4.9) gives a proof of this result.

The width n of a group G of symplectic type is the largest integer n such that the group contains an extraspecial subgroup H of order p^{1+2n} such that G = H.C_{G}(H), or 0 if G contains no such subgroup.

Groups of symplectic type appear in centralizers of involutions of groups of GF(2)-type.
