= Focal subgroup theorem =

Theorem describing fusion of elements in Sylow subgroup of finite group

In abstract algebra, the focal subgroup theorem describes the fusion of elements in a Sylow subgroup of a finite group. The focal subgroup theorem was introduced in (Higman 1953) and is the "first major application of the transfer" according to (Gorenstein, Lyons & Solomon 1996, p. 90). The focal subgroup theorem relates the ideas of transfer and fusion such as described by Otto Grün in (Grün 1936). Various applications of these ideas include local criteria for p-nilpotence and various non-simplicity criteria focussing on showing that a finite group has a normal subgroup of index p.

== Background ==
The focal subgroup theorem relates several lines of investigation in finite group theory: normal subgroups of index a power of p, the transfer homomorphism, and fusion of elements.

=== Subgroups ===
The following three normal subgroups of index a power of p are naturally defined, and arise as the smallest normal subgroups such that the quotient is (a certain kind of) p-group. Formally, they are kernels of the reflection onto the reflective subcategory of p-groups (respectively, elementary abelian p-groups, abelian p-groups).

- E^{p}(G) is the intersection of all index p normal subgroups; G/E^{p}(G) is an elementary abelian group, and is the largest elementary abelian p-group onto which G surjects.
- A^{p}(G) (notation from (Isaacs 2008, 5D, p. 164)) is the intersection of all normal subgroups K such that G/K is an abelian p-group (i.e., K is an index $p^k$ normal subgroup that contains the derived group $[G,G]$): G/A^{p}(G) is the largest abelian p-group (not necessarily elementary) onto which G surjects.
- O^{p}(G) is the intersection of all normal subgroups K of G such that G/K is a (possibly non-abelian) p-group (i.e., K is an index $p^k$ normal subgroup): G/O^{p}(G) is the largest p-group (not necessarily abelian) onto which G surjects. O^{p}(G) is also known as the p-residual subgroup.

Firstly, as these are weaker conditions on the groups K, one obtains the containments $\mathbf{E}^p(G) \supseteq \mathbf{A}^p(G) \supseteq \mathbf{O}^p(G).$ These are further related as:

A^{p}(G) = O^{p}(G)[G,G].

O^{p}(G) has the following alternative characterization as the subgroup generated by all Sylow q-subgroups of G as q≠p ranges over the prime divisors of the order of G distinct from p.

O^{p}(G) is used to define the lower p-series of G, similarly to the upper p-series described in p-core.

=== Transfer homomorphism ===
The transfer homomorphism is a homomorphism that can be defined from any group G to the abelian group H/[H,H] defined by a subgroup H ≤ G of finite index, that is [G:H] < ∞. The transfer map from a finite group G into its Sylow p-subgroup has a kernel that is easy to describe:

The kernel of the transfer homomorphism from a finite group G into its Sylow p-subgroup P has A^{p}(G) as its kernel, (Isaacs 2008, Theorem 5.20, p. 165).

In other words, the "obvious" homomorphism onto an abelian p-group is in fact the most general such homomorphism.

=== Fusion ===
The fusion pattern of a subgroup H in G is the equivalence relation on the elements of H where two elements h, k of H are fused if they are G-conjugate, that is, if there is some g in G such that h = k^{g}. The normal structure of G has an effect on the fusion pattern of its Sylow p-subgroups, and conversely the fusion pattern of its Sylow p-subgroups has an effect on the normal structure of G, (Gorenstein, Lyons & Solomon 1996, p. 89).

=== Focal subgroup ===
One can define, as in (Isaacs 2008, p. 165) the focal subgroup of H with respect to G as:

Foc_{G}(H) = ⟨ x^{−1} y | x,y in H and x is G-conjugate to y ⟩.

This focal subgroup measures the extent to which elements of H fuse in G, while the previous definition measured certain abelian p-group homomorphic images of the group G. The content of the focal subgroup theorem is that these two definitions of focal subgroup are compatible.

(Gorenstein 1980, p. 246) shows that the focal subgroup of P in G is the intersection P∩[G,G] of the Sylow p-subgroup P of the finite group G with the derived subgroup [G,G] of G. The focal subgroup is important as it is a Sylow p-subgroup of the derived subgroup. One also gets the following result:

There exists a normal subgroup K of G with G/K an abelian p-group isomorphic to P/P∩[G,G] (here K denotes A^{p}(G)), and
if K is a normal subgroup of G with G/K an abelian p-group, then P∩[G,G] ≤ K, and G/K is a homomorphic image of P/P∩[G,G], (Gorenstein 1980, Theorem 7.3.1, p. 90).

== Statement of the theorem ==
The focal subgroup of a finite group G with Sylow p-subgroup P is given by:

P∩[G,G] = P∩A^{p}(G) = P∩ker(v) = Foc_{G}(P) = ⟨ x^{−1} y | x,y in P and x is G-conjugate to y ⟩

where v is the transfer homomorphism from G to P/[P,P], (Isaacs 2008, Theorem 5.21, p. 165).

== History and generalizations ==
This connection between transfer and fusion is credited to (Higman 1953), where, in different language, the focal subgroup theorem was proved along with various generalizations. The requirement that G/K be abelian was dropped, so that Higman also studied O^{p}(G) and the nilpotent residual γ_{∞}(G), as so called hyperfocal subgroups. Higman also did not restrict to a single prime p, but rather allowed π-groups for sets of primes π and used Philip Hall's theorem of Hall subgroups in order to prove similar results about the transfer into Hall π-subgroups; taking π = {p} a Hall π-subgroup is a Sylow p-subgroup, and the results of Higman are as presented above.

Interest in the hyperfocal subgroups was renewed by work of (Puig 2000) in understanding the modular representation theory of certain well behaved blocks. The hyperfocal subgroup of P in G can defined as P∩γ_{∞}(G) that is, as a Sylow p-subgroup of the nilpotent residual of G. If P is a Sylow p-subgroup of the finite group G, then one gets the standard focal subgroup theorem:

P∩γ_{∞}(G) = P∩O^{p}(G) = ⟨ x^{−1} y : x,y in P and y = x^{g} for some g in G of order coprime to p ⟩

and the local characterization:

P∩O^{p}(G) = ⟨ x^{−1} y : x,y in Q ≤ P and y = x^{g} for some g in N_{G}(Q) of order coprime to p ⟩.

This compares to the local characterization of the focal subgroup as:

P∩A^{p}(G) = ⟨ x^{−1} y : x,y in Q ≤ P and y = x^{g} for some g in N_{G}(Q) ⟩.

Puig is interested in the generalization of this situation to fusion systems, a categorical model of the fusion pattern of a Sylow p-subgroup with respect to a finite group that also models the fusion pattern of a defect group of a p-block in modular representation theory. In fact fusion systems have found a number of surprising applications and inspirations in the area of algebraic topology known as equivariant homotopy theory. Some of the major algebraic theorems in this area only have topological proofs at the moment.

== Other characterizations ==
Various mathematicians have presented methods to calculate the focal subgroup from smaller groups. For instance, the influential work (Alperin 1967) develops the idea of a local control of fusion, and as an example application shows that:

P ∩ A^{p}(G) is generated by the commutator subgroups [Q, N_{G}(Q)] where Q varies over a family C of subgroups of P

The choice of the family C can be made in many ways (C is what is called a "weak conjugation family" in (Alperin 1967)), and several examples are given: one can take C to be all non-identity subgroups of P, or the smaller choice of just the intersections Q = P ∩ P^{g} for g in G in which N_{P}(Q) and N_{P^{g}}(Q) are both Sylow p-subgroups of N_{G}(Q). The latter choice is made in (Gorenstein 1980, Theorem 7.4.1, p. 251). The work of (Grün 1936) studied aspects of the transfer and fusion as well, resulting in Grün's first theorem:

P ∩ A^{p}(G) is generated by P ∩ [N, N] and P ∩ [Q, Q] where N = N_{G}(P) and Q ranges over the set of Sylow p-subgroups Q = P^{g} of G (Gorenstein 1980, Theorem 7.4.2, p. 252).

== Applications ==
The textbook presentations in (Rose 1978, pp. 254–264), (Isaacs 2008, Chapter 5), (Hall 1959, Chapter 14), (Suzuki 1986, §5.2, pp. 138–165), all contain various applications of the focal subgroup theorem relating fusion, transfer, and a certain kind of splitting called p-nilpotence.

During the course of the Alperin–Brauer–Gorenstein theorem classifying finite simple groups with quasi-dihedral Sylow 2-subgroups, it becomes necessary to distinguish four types of groups with quasi-dihedral Sylow 2-subgroups: the 2-nilpotent groups, the Q-type groups whose focal subgroup is a generalized quaternion group of index 2, the D-type groups whose focal subgroup a dihedral group of index 2, and the QD-type groups whose focal subgroup is the entire quasi-dihedral group. In terms of fusion, the 2-nilpotent groups have 2 classes of involutions, and 2 classes of cyclic subgroups of order 4; the Q-type have 2 classes of involutions and one class of cyclic subgroup of order 4; the QD-type have one class each of involutions and cyclic subgroups of order 4. In other words, finite groups with quasi-dihedral Sylow 2-subgroups can be classified according to their focal subgroup, or equivalently, according to their fusion patterns. The explicit lists of groups with each fusion pattern are contained in (Alperin, Brauer & Gorenstein 1970).
