= CN-group =

In mathematics, in the area of algebra known as group theory, a more than fifty-year effort was made to answer a conjecture of (Burnside 1911): are all groups of odd order solvable? Progress was made by showing that CA-groups, groups in which the centralizer of a non-identity element is abelian, of odd order are solvable (Suzuki 1957). Further progress was made showing that CN-groups, groups in which the centralizer of a non-identity element is nilpotent, of odd order are solvable (Feit, Thompson & Hall 1960). The complete solution was given in (Feit & Thompson 1963), but further work on CN-groups was done in (Suzuki 1961), giving more detailed information about the structure of these groups. For instance, a non-solvable CN-group G is such that its largest solvable normal subgroup O_{∞}(G) is a 2-group, and the quotient is a group of even order.

== Examples ==
Solvable CN groups include

- Nilpotent groups
- Frobenius groups whose Frobenius complement is nilpotent
- 3-step groups, such as the symmetric group S_{4}

Non-solvable CN groups include:

- The Suzuki simple groups
- The groups PSL_{2}(F_{2^{n}}) for n>1
- The group PSL_{2}(F_{p}) for p>3 a Fermat prime or Mersenne prime.
- The group PSL_{2}(F_{9})
- The group PSL_{3}(F_{4})
