= Closure with a twist =

Algebraic property of specific subsets, such as cwatsets and GC-sets

In mathematics, closure with a twist is an algebraic condition describing a subset that maps onto itself ("closure"), not necessarily identically, but under a group automorphism (a "twist") when acted upon by one of its own elements.

Formally, a subset $H$ of a group $G$ is said to exhibit closure with a twist if each of its cosets is an image of $H$ under some automorphism of $G$. That is, for every element $h \in H$, there exists an automorphism $\phi_h$ of $G$ such that:

$$H \cdot h = \phi_h(H)$$

where "$\cdot$" denotes the group operation on $G$, and $\phi_h(H)$ is the image of the entire subset $H$ under the automorphism $\phi_h$. ("Coset" here is used loosely, as this concept is interesting when $H$ is not itself a group.)

Two examples of algebraic structures which exhibit closure with a twist are the cwatset and the generalized cwatset, or GC-set.

== Cwatset ==
In mathematics, a cwatset is a set of bitstrings, all of the same length, which is closed with a twist.

If each string in a cwatset, C, say, is of length n, then C will be a subset of $\mathbb{Z}_2^n$. Thus, two strings in C are added by adding the bits in the strings modulo 2 (that is, addition without carry, or exclusive disjunction). The symmetric group on n letters, $\text{Sym}(n)$, acts on $\mathbb{Z}_2^n$ by bit permutation:

$$p((c_1, \ldots, c_n)) = (c_{p(1)}, \ldots, c_{p(n)}),$$

where $c = (c_1, \ldots, c_n)$ is an element of $\mathbb{Z}_2^n$ and p is an element of $\text{Sym}(n)$. Closure with a twist now means that for each element c in C, there exists some permutation $p_c$ such that, when you add c to an arbitrary element e in the cwatset and then apply the permutation, the result will also be an element of C. That is, denoting addition without carry by $+$, C will be a cwatset if and only if

$$\forall c\in C : \exists p_c\in \text{Sym}(n) : \forall e\in C : p_c(e+c) \in C.$$

This condition can also be written as

$$\forall c\in C : \exists p_c\in \text{Sym}(n) : p_c(C+c)=C.$$

=== Examples ===
- All subgroups of $\mathbb{Z}_2^n$ — that is, nonempty subsets of $\mathbb{Z}_2^n$ which are closed under addition-without-carry — are trivially cwatsets, since we can choose each permutation p_{c} to be the identity permutation.
- An example of a cwatset which is not a group is

F = {000,110,101}.

To demonstrate that F is a cwatset, observe that

F + 000 = F.
F + 110 = {110,000,011}, which is F with the first two bits of each string transposed.
F + 101 = {101,011,000}, which is the same as F after exchanging the first and third bits in each string.

- A matrix representation of a cwatset is formed by writing its words as the rows of a 0-1 matrix. For instance a matrix representation of F is given by

$$F = \begin{bmatrix}
0 & 0 & 0 \\
1 & 1 & 0 \\
1 & 0 & 1
\end{bmatrix}.$$

To see that F is a cwatset using this notation, note that

$$F + 000 = \begin{bmatrix}
0 & 0 & 0 \\
1 & 1 & 0 \\
1 & 0 & 1
\end{bmatrix} = F^{id}=F^{(2,3)_R(2,3)_C}.$$

$$F + 110 = \begin{bmatrix}
1 & 1 & 0 \\
0 & 0 & 0 \\
0 & 1 & 1
\end{bmatrix} = F^{(1,2)_R(1,2)_C}=F^{(1,2,3)_R(1,2,3)_C}.$$

$$F + 101 = \begin{bmatrix}
1 & 0 & 1 \\
0 & 1 & 1 \\
0 & 0 & 0
\end{bmatrix} = F^{(1,3)_R(1,3)_C}=F^{(1,3,2)_R(1,3,2)_C}.$$

where $\pi_R$ and $\sigma_C$ denote permutations of the rows and columns of the matrix, respectively, expressed in cycle notation.

- For any $n \geq 3$ another example of a cwatset is $K_n$, which has $n$-by-$n$ matrix representation

$$K_n = \begin{bmatrix}
0 & 0 & 0 & \cdots & 0 & 0 \\
1 & 1 & 0 & \cdots & 0 & 0 \\
1 & 0 & 1 & \cdots & 0 & 0 \\
& & & \vdots & & \\
1 & 0 & 0 & \cdots & 1 & 0 \\
1 & 0 & 0 & \cdots & 0 & 1
\end{bmatrix}.$$

Note that for $n = 3$, $K_3=F$.

- An example of a nongroup cwatset with a rectangular matrix representation is

$$W = \begin{bmatrix}
0 & 0 & 0\\
1 & 0 & 0\\
1 & 1 & 0\\
1 & 1 & 1\\
0 & 1 & 1\\
0 & 0 & 1
\end{bmatrix}.$$

=== Properties ===
Let $C \subset \mathbb{Z}_2^n$ be a cwatset.

- The degree of C is equal to the exponent n.
- The order of C, denoted by |C|, is the set cardinality of C.
- There is a necessary condition on the order of a cwatset in terms of its degree, which is

analogous to Lagrange's Theorem in group theory. To wit,

Theorem. If C is a cwatset of degree n and order m, then m divides $2^n!$.

The divisibility condition is necessary but not sufficient. For example, there does not exist a cwatset of degree 5 and order 15.

== Generalized cwatset ==
In mathematics, a generalized cwatset (GC-set) is an algebraic structure generalizing the notion of closure with a twist, the defining characteristic of the cwatset.

=== Definitions ===
A subset H of a group G is a GC-set if for each $h\in H$, there exists a $\phi_h\in\text{Aut}(G)$ such that $\phi_h(h) \cdot H = \phi_h(H)$.

Furthermore, a GC-set H ⊆ G is a cyclic GC-set if there exists an $h\in H$ and a $\phi\in\text{Aut}(G)$ such that $H = {h_1, h_2, ...}$ where $h_1 = h$ and $h_n = h_1 \cdot \phi(h_{n-1})$ for all $n > 1$.

=== Examples ===
- Any cwatset is a GC-set, since $C + c = \pi(C)$ implies that $\pi^{-1}(c) + C = \pi^{-1}(C)$.
- Any group is a GC-set, satisfying the definition with the identity automorphism.
- A non-trivial example of a GC-set is $H = {0, 2}$ where $G = Z_{10}$.
- A nonexample showing that the definition is not trivial for subsets of $Z_2^n$ is $H = {000, 100, 010, 001, 110}$.

=== Properties ===
- A GC-set H ⊆ G always contains the identity element of G.
- The direct product of GC-sets is again a GC-set.
- A subset H ⊆ G is a GC-set if and only if it is the projection of a subgroup of Aut(G)⋉G, the semi-direct product of Aut(G) and G.
- As a consequence of the previous property, GC-sets have an analogue of Lagrange's Theorem: The order of a GC-set divides the order of Aut(G)⋉G.
- If a GC-set H has the same order as the subgroup of Aut(G)⋉G of which it is the projection then for each prime power $p^{q}$ which divides the order of H, H contains sub-GC-sets of orders p,$p^{2}$,...,$p^{q}$. (Analogue of the first Sylow Theorem)
- A GC-set is cyclic if and only if it is the projection of a cyclic subgroup of Aut(G)⋉G.
