= Group of GF(2)-type =

In mathematics, specifically finite group theory, a group of GF(2)-type is a group with an involution centralizer whose generalized Fitting subgroup is a group of symplectic type (Gorenstein 1982, definition 1.45).

As the name suggests, many of the groups of Lie type over the field with 2 elements are groups of GF(2)-type. Also 16 of the 26 sporadic groups are of GF(2)-type, suggesting that in some sense sporadic groups are somehow related to special properties of the field with 2 elements.

Timmesfeld (1978) showed roughly that groups of GF(2)-type can be subdivided into 8 types. The groups of each of these 8 types were classified by various authors. They consist mainly of groups of Lie type with all roots of the same length over the field with 2 elements, but also include many exceptional cases, including the majority of the sporadic groups. Smith (1980) gave a survey of this work.

Smith (1979, p.279) gives a table of simple groups containing a large extraspecial 2-group.

== Bibliography ==
- Gorenstein, D. (1982), Finite simple groups, University Series in Mathematics, New York: Plenum Publishing Corp., ISBN 978-0-306-40779-6, MR 0698782
- Smith, Stephen D. (1979), "Large extraspecial subgroups of widths 4 and 6", Journal of Algebra, 58 (2): 251–281, doi:10.1016/0021-8693(79)90160-1, ISSN 0021-8693, MR 0540638
- Smith, Stephen D. (1980), "The classification of finite groups with large extraspecial 2-subgroups", The Santa Cruz Conference on Finite Groups (Univ. California, Santa Cruz, Calif., 1979), Proc. Sympos. Pure Math., vol. 37, Providence, R.I.: Amer. Math. Soc., pp. 111–120, MR 0604567
- Timmesfeld, Franz (1978), "Finite simple groups in which the generalized Fitting group of the centralizer of some involution is extraspecial", Annals of Mathematics, Second Series, 107 (2): 297–369, doi:10.2307/1971146, ISSN 0003-486X, MR 0486255 Correction: Timmesfeld, Franz (1979), "Correction to Finite simple groups in which the generalized Fitting group of the centralizer of some involution is extraspecial", Annals of Mathematics, Second Series, 109 (2): 413–414, doi:10.2307/1971119, ISSN 0003-486X, JSTOR 1971119, MR 0486255
