= Power closed =

In mathematics a p-group $G$ is called power closed if for every section $H$ of $G$ the product of $p^k$ powers is again a $p^k$th power.

Regular p-groups are an example of power closed groups. On the other hand, powerful p-groups, for which the product of $p^k$ powers is again a $p^k$th power are not power closed, as this property does not hold for all sections of powerful p-groups.

The power closed 2-groups of exponent at least eight are described in (Mann 2005, Th. 16).
