= Replacement theorem =

In mathematical group theory, the Thompson replacement theorem is a theorem about the existence of certain abelian subgroups of a p-group. The Glauberman replacement theorem is a generalization of it introduced by Glauberman (1968, Theorem 4.1).

== Statement ==
Suppose that P is a finite p-group for some prime p, and let A be the set of abelian subgroups of P of maximal order. Suppose that B is some abelian subgroup of P. The Thompson replacement theorem says that if A is an element of A that normalizes B but is not normalized by B, then there is another element A* of A such that A*∩B is strictly larger than A∩B, and [A*,A] normalizes A.

The Glauberman replacement theorem is similar, except p is assumed to be odd and the condition that B is abelian is weakened to the condition that [B,B] commutes with B and with all elements of A. Glauberman says in his paper that he does not know whether the condition that p is odd is necessary.
