= Coclass =

Mathematical concept

In mathematics, the coclass of a finite p-group of order p^{n} is n − c where c is the nilpotency class.

== The coclass conjectures ==
The coclass conjectures were introduced by Leedham-Green and Newman (1980) and proved by Leedham-Green (1994) and Shalev (1994). They are:

- Conjecture A: Every p-group has a normal subgroup of class 2 with index depending only on p and its coclass.
- Conjecture B: The solvable length of a p-group can be bounded in terms of p and the coclass.
- Conjecture C: A pro p-group of finite coclass is solvable.
- Conjecture D: There are only finitely many pro p-groups of given coclass.
- Conjecture E: There are only finitely many solvable pro p-groups of given coclass.

== See also ==
- Descendant tree (group theory)
