= Special group =

Special group may refer to:

== Group of people ==
- Special Group (India), a secretive special forces unit of Indian intelligence.
- Special Groups (Iraq), insurgent groups operating within Iraq.
- Special Groups (Portugal), small military units, set up by the Portuguese Armed Forces in Angola and in Mozambique.
- NSC 5412/2 Special Group, a subcommittee of the United States National Security Council responsible for coordinating government covert operations.
- Special forces, specialist military units.

== Mathematics ==
- Special group (algebraic group theory) is a linear algebraic group such that every principal G-bundle is locally trivial
- Special group (finite group theory) is a type of finite groups of prime power order
- Special Lie groups are Lie groups of matrices with determinant 1:
  - Special linear group
  - Special orthogonal group
  - Special unitary group
  - Special affine group
