= Cauchy's theorem (group theory) =

Existence of group elements of prime order

In mathematics, specifically group theory, Cauchy's theorem states that if G is a finite group and p is a prime number dividing the order of G (the number of elements in G), then G contains an element of order p. That is, there is x in G such that p is the smallest positive integer with x^{p} = e, where e is the identity element of G. It is named after Augustin-Louis Cauchy, who discovered it in 1845.

The theorem is a partial converse to Lagrange's theorem, which states that the order of any subgroup of a finite group G divides the order of G. In general, not every divisor of $|G|$ arises as the order of a subgroup of $G$. Cauchy's theorem states that for any prime divisor p of the order of G, there is a subgroup of G whose order is p—the cyclic group generated by the element in Cauchy's theorem.

Cauchy's theorem is generalized by Sylow's first theorem, which implies that if p^{n} is the maximal power of p dividing the order of G, then G has a subgroup of order p^{n} (and using the fact that a p-group is solvable, one can show that G has subgroups of order p^{r} for any r less than or equal to n).

== Statement and proof ==
Many texts prove the theorem with the use of strong induction and the class equation, though considerably less machinery is required to prove the theorem in the abelian case. One can also invoke group actions for the proof.

Cauchy's theorem—Let G be a finite group and p be a prime. If p divides the order of G, then G has an element of order p.

=== Proof 1 ===
We first prove the special case that where G is abelian, and then the general case; both proofs are by induction on n = |G|, and have as starting case n = p which is trivial because any non-identity element now has order p. Suppose first that G is abelian. Take any non-identity element a, and let H be the cyclic group it generates. If p divides |H|, then a^{|H|/p} is an element of order p. If p does not divide |H|, then it divides the order [G:H] of the quotient group G/H, which therefore contains an element of order p by the inductive hypothesis. That element is a class xH for some x in G, and if m is the order of x in G, then x^{m} = e in G gives (xH)^{m} = eH in G/H, so p divides m; as before x^{m/p} is now an element of order p in G, completing the proof for the abelian case.

In the general case, let Z be the center of G, which is an abelian subgroup. If p divides |Z|, then Z contains an element of order p by the case of abelian groups, and this element works for G as well. So we may assume that p does not divide the order of Z. Since p does divide |G|, and G is the disjoint union of Z and of the conjugacy classes of non-central elements, there exists a conjugacy class of a non-central element a whose size is not divisible by p. But the class equation shows that size is [G : C_{G}(a)], so p divides the order of the centralizer C_{G}(a) of a in G, which is a proper subgroup because a is not central. This subgroup contains an element of order p by the inductive hypothesis, and we are done.

=== Proof 2 ===
This proof uses the fact that for any action of a (cyclic) group of prime order p, the only possible orbit sizes are 1 and p, which follows directly from the orbit–stabilizer theorem.

The set that our cyclic group shall act on is the set

$$X = \{\,(x_1,\ldots,x_p) \in G^p : x_1x_2\cdots x_p = e\, \}$$

of p-tuples of elements of G whose product (in order) gives the identity. Such a p-tuple is uniquely determined by all its components except the last one, as the last element must be the inverse of the product of those preceding elements. One also sees that those p − 1 elements can be chosen freely, so X has |G|^{p−1} elements, which is divisible by p.

Now from the fact that in a group if ab = e then ba = e, it follows that any cyclic permutation of the components of an element of X again gives an element of X. Therefore one can define an action of the cyclic group C_{p} of order p on X by cyclic permutations of components, in other words in which a chosen generator of C_{p} sends

$$(x_1,x_2,\ldots,x_p)\mapsto(x_2,\ldots,x_p,x_1)$$.

As remarked, orbits in X under this action either have size 1 or size p. The former happens precisely for those tuples $(x,x,\ldots,x)$ for which $x^p=e$. Counting the elements of X by orbits, and dividing by p, one sees that the number of elements satisfying $x^p=e$ is divisible by p. But x = e is one such element, so there must be at least p − 1 other solutions for x, and these solutions are elements of order p. This completes the proof.

== Applications ==
Cauchy's theorem implies a rough classification of all elementary abelian groups (groups whose non-identity elements all have equal, finite order). If $G$ is such a group, and $x \in G$ has order $p$, then $p$ must be prime, since otherwise Cauchy's theorem applied to the (finite) subgroup generated by $x$ produces an element of order less than $p$. Moreover, every finite subgroup of $G$ has order a power of $p$ (including $G$ itself, if it is finite). This argument applies equally to p-groups, where every element's order is a power of $p$ (but not necessarily every order is the same).

One may use the abelian case of Cauchy's Theorem in an inductive proof of the first of Sylow's theorems, similar to the first proof above, although there are also proofs that avoid doing this special case separately.
