= Three subgroups lemma =

In mathematics, more specifically group theory, the three subgroups lemma is a result concerning commutators. It is a consequence of Philip Hall and Ernst Witt's eponymous identity.

== Notation ==
In what follows, the following notation will be employed:

- If H and K are subgroups of a group G, the commutator of H and K, denoted by [H, K], is defined as the subgroup of G generated by commutators between elements in the two subgroups. If L is a third subgroup, the convention that [H,K,L] = [[H,K],L] will be followed.
- If x and y are elements of a group G, the conjugate of x by y will be denoted by $x^{y}$.
- If H is a subgroup of a group G, then the centralizer of H in G will be denoted by C_{G}(H).

== Statement ==
Let X, Y and Z be subgroups of a group G, and assume

$[X,Y,Z]=1$ and $[Y,Z,X]=1.$

Then $[Z,X,Y]=1$.

More generally, for a normal subgroup $N$ of $G$, if $[X,Y,Z]\subseteq N$ and $[Y,Z,X]\subseteq N$, then $[Z,X,Y]\subseteq N$.

== Proof and the Hall–Witt identity ==
Hall–Witt identity

If $x,y,z\in G$, then

$$[x, y^{-1}, z]^y\cdot[y, z^{-1}, x]^z\cdot[z, x^{-1}, y]^x = 1.$$

Proof of the three subgroups lemma

Let $x\in X$, $y\in Y$, and $z\in Z$. Then $[x,y^{-1},z]=1=[y,z^{-1},x]$, and by the Hall–Witt identity above, it follows that $[z,x^{-1},y]^{x}=1$ and so $[z,x^{-1},y]=1$. Therefore, $[z,x^{-1}]\in \mathbf{C}_G(Y)$ for all $z\in Z$ and $x\in X$. Since these elements generate $[Z,X]$, we conclude that $[Z,X]\subseteq \mathbf{C}_G(Y)$ and hence $[Z,X,Y]=1$.

== See also ==
- Commutator
- Lower central series
- Grün's lemma
- Jacobi identity
