= Fitting length =

Measurement in group theory algebra mathematics

In mathematics, specifically in the area of algebra known as group theory, the Fitting length (or nilpotent length) measures how far a solvable group is from being nilpotent. The concept is named after Hans Fitting, due to his investigations of nilpotent normal subgroups.

== Definition ==
A Fitting chain (or Fitting series or nilpotent series) for a group is a subnormal series with nilpotent quotients. In other words, a finite sequence of subgroups including both the whole group and the trivial group, such that each is a normal subgroup of the previous one, and such that the quotients of successive terms are nilpotent groups.

The Fitting length or nilpotent length of a group is defined to be the smallest possible length of a Fitting chain, if one exists.

== Upper and lower Fitting series ==
Just as the upper central series and lower central series are extremal among central series, there are analogous series extremal among nilpotent series.

For a finite group H, the Fitting subgroup Fit(H) is the maximal normal nilpotent subgroup, while the minimal normal subgroup such that the quotient by it is nilpotent is γ_{∞}(H), the intersection of the (finite) lower central series, which is called the nilpotent residual. These correspond to the center and the commutator subgroup (for upper and lower central series, respectively). These do not hold for infinite groups, so for the sequel, assume all groups to be finite.

The upper Fitting series of a finite group is the sequence of characteristic subgroups Fit^{n}(G) defined by Fit^{0}(G) = 1, and Fit^{n+1}(G)/Fit^{n}(G) = Fit(G/Fit^{n}(G)). It is an ascending nilpotent series, at each step taking the maximal possible subgroup.

The lower Fitting series of a finite group G is the sequence of characteristic subgroups F_{n}(G) defined by F_{0}(G) = G, and F_{n+1}(G) = γ_{∞}(F_{n}(G)). It is a descending nilpotent series, at each step taking the minimal possible subgroup.

== Examples ==
- A nontrivial group has Fitting length 1 if and only if it is nilpotent.
- The symmetric group on three points has Fitting length 2.
- The symmetric group on four points has Fitting length 3.
- The symmetric group on five or more points has no Fitting chain at all, not being solvable.
- The iterated wreath product of n copies of the symmetric group on three points has Fitting length 2n.

== Properties ==
- A group has a Fitting chain if and only if it is solvable.
- The lower Fitting series is a Fitting chain if and only if it eventually reaches the trivial subgroup, if and only if G is solvable.
- The upper Fitting series is a Fitting chain if and only if it eventually reaches the whole group, G, if and only if G is solvable.
- The lower Fitting series descends most quickly amongst all Fitting chains, and the upper Fitting series ascends most quickly amongst all Fitting chains. Explicitly: For every Fitting chain, 1 = H_{0} ⊲ H_{1} ⊲ … ⊲ H_{n} = G, one has that H_{i} ≤ Fit^{i}(G), and F_{i}(G) ≤ H_{n−i}.
- For a solvable group, the length of the lower Fitting series is equal to length of the upper Fitting series, and this common length is the Fitting length of the group.

More information can be found in (Huppert 1967, Kap. III, §4).

== Connection between central series and Fitting series ==
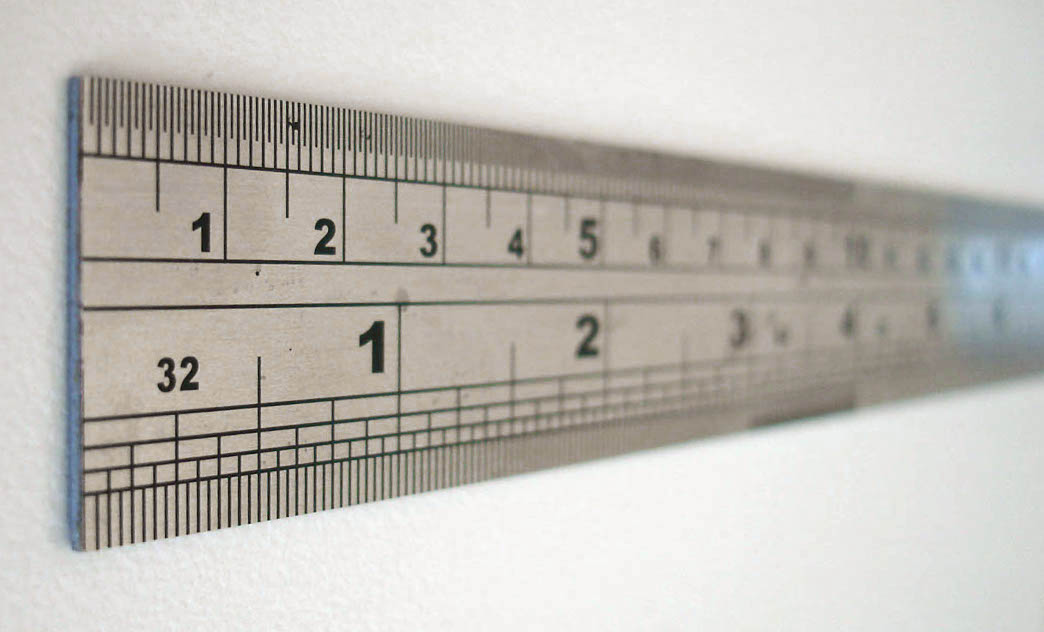
Combining the lower Fitting series and lower central series on a solvable group yields a series with coarse and fine divisions, like the coarse and fine marks on a ruler.

What central series do for nilpotent groups, Fitting series do for solvable groups. A group has a central series if and only if it is nilpotent, and a Fitting series if and only if it is solvable.

Given a solvable group, the lower Fitting series is a "coarser" division than the lower central series: the lower Fitting series gives a series for the whole group, while the lower central series descends only from the whole group to the first term of the Fitting series.

The lower Fitting series proceeds:

G = F_{0} ⊵ F_{1} ⊵ ⋯ ⊵ 1,

while the lower central series subdivides the first step,

G = G_{1} ⊵ G_{2} ⊵ ⋯ ⊵ F_{1},

and is a lift of the lower central series for the first quotient F_{0}/F_{1}, which is nilpotent.

Proceeding in this way (lifting the lower central series for each quotient of the Fitting series) yields a subnormal series:

G = G_{1} ⊵ G_{2} ⊵ ⋯ ⊵ F_{1} = F_{1,1} ⊵ F_{1,2} ⊵ ⋯ ⊵ F_{2} = F_{2,1} ⊵ ⋯ ⊵ F_{n} = 1,

like the coarse and fine divisions on a ruler.

The successive quotients are abelian, showing the equivalence between being solvable and having a Fitting series.

== See also ==
- Central series
- 3-step group
