= Bettina Eick =

German mathematician (born 1968)

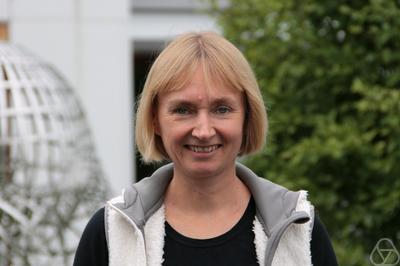
- Eick at Oberwolfach in 2016
- Born: 1968 (age 56–57)
- Scientific career
- Thesis: Charakterisierung und Konstruktion von Frattinigruppen mit Anwendungen in der Konstruktion endlicher Gruppen (1996)
- Doctoral advisor: Joachim Neubüser

Bettina Eick is a German mathematician specializing in computational group theory. She is Professor of Mathematics at the Technische Universität (TU) Braunschweig.

== Life and education ==
Eick was born on May 16, 1968. She attended the Rheinische-Westfälische Technische Hochschule (RWTH) Aachen from 1987 to 1993. During that time she spent a year at the Queen Mary and Westfield College (currently known as Queen Mary University London). In 1993, she completed her Diplom thesis under the supervision of Joachim Neubüser.

In 1996, Eick earned her PhD also at RWTH Aachen under the supervision of Neubüser. Her dissertation was entitled Charakterisierung und Konstruktion von Frattinigruppen mit Anwendungen in der Konstruktion endlicher Gruppen (Characterization and Constructions of Frattini Groups with Applications to the Construction of Finite Groups).

== Career ==
Eick began her career with postdoctoral positions at RWTH Aachen and the University of Würzburg. She received her habilitation at the University of Kassel in 2001 before joining TU Braunschweig.

Eick is known for her work in algorithmic algebra and group theory. Her early work focused on the development of practical algorithms for polycyclic groups and the construction of finite groups. She is one of the main developers of the SmallGroups library. This database contains, among others, a complete list of all groups of order at most 2000, except for order 1024. The list includes more than 400 million finite groups and is available in the computer algebra systems GAP, Magma, SageMath, and Oscar.

Since 2000, Eick has been a contributor to the "coclass project" that aims to classify groups of prime power order and other nilpotent algebraic objects using coclass as a primary invariant. In 2005, 2011 and 2017 she was a guest scientist at the University of Auckland working with Eamonn O'Brien and funded by the Feodor Lynen Research Fellowship from the Alexander von Humboldt Foundation.

Eick is a coauthor of the computer algebra system GAP and has been a member of the GAP council since 2001 (chair since 2021).

== Selected publications ==
- Eick, Bettina; Leedham-Green, Charles (2008). "On the classification of prime-power groups by coclass". Bulletin of the London Mathematical Society. 40 (2). Wiley: 274–288. doi:10.1112/blms/bdn007. ISSN 0024-6093. S2CID 119988315.
- Holt, Derek F.; Eick, Bettina; O'Brien, Eamonn A. (2005). Handbook of computational group theory. Boca Raton: Chapman & Hall/CRC. ISBN 1-58488-372-3. OCLC 56729581.
- Besche, Hans Ulrich; Eick, Bettina; O'Brien, Eamonn A. (2002). "A Millennium Project: Constructing Small Groups". International Journal of Algebra and Computation. 12 (5). World Scientific Pub Co Pte Lt: 623–644. doi:10.1142/s0218196702001115. ISSN 0218-1967.
