= Product of groups =

In mathematics, a product of groups usually refers to a direct product of groups, but may also mean:

- semidirect product
- Product of group subsets
- wreath product
- Zappa–Szép product
- free product
- central product
