= 3-step group =

In mathematics, a 3-step group is a special sort of group of Fitting length at most 3, that is used in the classification of CN groups and in the Feit–Thompson theorem. The definition of a 3-step group in these two cases is slightly different.

== CN groups ==
In the theory of CN groups, a 3-step group (for some prime p) is a group such that:

- G = O_{p,p',p}(G)
- O_{p,p′}(G) is a Frobenius group with kernel O_{p}(G)
- G/O_{p}(G) is a Frobenius group with kernel O_{p,p′}(G)/O_{p}(G)

Any 3-step group is a solvable CN-group, and conversely any solvable CN-group is either nilpotent, or a Frobenius group, or a 3-step group.

Example: the symmetric group S_{4} is a 3-step group for the prime p = 2.

== Odd order groups ==
Feit & Thompson (1963, p.780) defined a three-step group to be a group G satisfying the following conditions:

- The derived group of G is a Hall subgroup with a cyclic complement Q.
- If H is the maximal normal nilpotent Hall subgroup of G, then G′′⊆HC_{G}(H)⊆G′ and HC_{G} is nilpotent and H is noncyclic.
- For q∈Q nontrivial, C_{G}(q) is cyclic and non-trivial and independent of q.
