= Jennings series =

Jennings series may refer to:

- Jennings (novel series), a children's literature series
- Central series#Refined central series, in mathematics
