= Acyclic =

Acyclic may refer to:

- In chemistry, a compound which is an open-chain compound, e.g. alkanes and acyclic aliphatic compounds
- In mathematics:
  - A graph without a cycle, especially
    - A directed acyclic graph
  - An acyclic complex is a chain complex all of whose homology groups are zero
    - An acyclic sheaf is a sheaf all of whose higher sheaf cohomology groups are zero
    - An acyclic space is a topological space all of whose homology groups are zero
- In economics, an economic indicator with little or no correlation to the business cycle
