= Special group (finite group theory) =

Concept in abstract algebra

In group theory, a discipline within abstract algebra, a special group is a finite group of prime power order that is either elementary abelian itself or of class 2 with its derived group, its center, and its Frattini subgroup all equal and elementary abelian (Gorenstein 1980, p.183). A special group of order p^{n} that has class 2 and whose derived group has order p is called an extra special group.
