= Residual property (mathematics) =

In the mathematical field of group theory, a group is residually X (where X is some property of groups) if it "can be recovered from groups with property X".

Formally, a group G is residually X if for every non-trivial element g there is a homomorphism h from G to a group with property X such that $h(g)\neq e$.

More categorically, a group is residually X if it embeds into its pro-X completion (see profinite group, pro-p group), that is, the inverse limit of the inverse system consisting of all morphisms $\phi\colon G \to H$ from G to some group H with property X.

== Examples ==
Important examples include:

- Residually finite
- Residually nilpotent
- Residually solvable
- Residually free
