= Otto Grün =

German mathematician

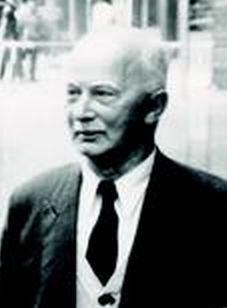
- Born: June 26, 1888; Berlin, Germany
- Died: October 1974 (aged 86)
- Education: Humboldt University of Berlin
- Known for: Group Theory
- Scientific career
- Thesis: Beiträge zur Gruppentheorie, III. (1948)
- Doctoral advisor: Hermann Ludwig Schmid

Otto Grün was a German mathematician. He was known primarily for his work in the theory of finite groups, which have often been praised for being foundational to further developments in the field. He was born on June 26, 1888, in Berlin. He obtained his Ph.D. from Humboldt University of Berlin in 1948 under the advisory of Hermann Ludwig Schmid. He died in October 1974 on or before the 10th.

== See also ==
- Grün's lemma
- Grün's first theorem

== Bibliography ==
- Roquette, Peter (2012) [manuscript written 2005]. "From FLT to Finite Groups: The remarkable career of Otto Grun" (PDF). Contributions to the History of Number Theory in the 20th Century. Heritage of European Mathematics. European Mathematics Society. pp. 77–116. ISBN 978-3-03719-113-2. OCLC 835905369. OL 26726435M. S2CID 17309465. Zbl 1276.11001. Archived from the original (PDF) on February 12, 2006.
