= Central product =

In mathematics, specifically group theory, the central product is one way of producing a group from two smaller groups. The central product is similar to the direct product, but in the central product two isomorphic central subgroups of the smaller groups are merged into a single central subgroup of the product. Central products are an important construction and can be used for instance to classify extraspecial groups.

== Definition ==
There are several related but distinct notions of central product. Similarly to the direct product, there are both internal and external characterizations, and additionally there are variations on how strictly the intersection of the factors is controlled.

A group $G$ is an internal central product of two subgroups $H,K$ if

1. $G$ is generated by $H$ and $K$.
2. Every element of $H$ commutes with every element of $K$.

Sometimes the stricter requirement that $H\cap K$ is exactly equal to the center is imposed. The subgroups $H$ and $K$ are then called central factors of $G$.

The external central product is constructed from two groups $H$ and $K$, two subgroups $H_1 \leq Z(H)$ and $K_1 \leq Z(K)$, and a group isomorphism $\theta : H_1 \to K_1$. The external central product is the quotient of the direct product $H\times K$ by the normal subgroup

$$N = \{ (h,k) : h\in H_1, k\in K_1, \text{ and } \,\theta(h)\cdot k = 1 \}.$$

Sometimes the stricter requirement that $H_1 = Z(H)$ and $K_1 = Z(K)$ is imposed.

An internal central product is isomorphic to an external central product with $H_1 = K_1 = H\cap K$ and $\theta$ the identity. An external central product is an internal central product of the images of $H\times 1$ and $1\times K$ in the quotient group $(H\times K) / N$.

Note that the external central product is not in general determined by its factors $H$ and $K$ alone. The isomorphism type of the central product will depend on the isomorphism $\theta$. It is however well defined in some notable situations, for example when $H$ and $K$ are both finite extra special groups and $H_1 = Z(H)$ and $K_1 = Z(K)$.

== Examples ==
- The Pauli group is the central product of the cyclic group $C_4$ and the dihedral group $D_4$.
- Every extra special group is a central product of extra special groups of order $p^3$.
- The layer of a finite group, that is, the subgroup generated by all subnormal quasisimple subgroups, is a central product of quasisimple groups in the sense of Gorenstein.

== Applications ==
The representation theory of central products is very similar to the representation theory of direct products, and so is well understood.

Central products occur in many structural lemmas, notably in George Glauberman's result that finite groups admitting a Klein four group of fixed-point-free automorphisms are solvable.

In certain context of a tensor product of Lie modules (and other related structures), the automorphism group contains a central product of the automorphism groups of each factor.
