= Index of a subgroup =

Mathematics group theory concept

In mathematics, specifically group theory, the index of a subgroup H in a group G is the number of left cosets of H in G, or equivalently, the number of right cosets of H in G. The index is denoted $|G:H|$ or $[G:H]$ or $(G:H)$. Because G is the disjoint union of the left cosets and because each left coset has the same size as H, the index is related to the orders of the two groups by the formula

$$|G| = |G:H| |H|$$

(interpret the quantities as cardinal numbers if some of them are infinite). Thus the index $|G:H|$ measures the "relative sizes" of G and H.

For example, let $G = \Z$ be the group of integers under addition, and let $H = 2\Z$ be the subgroup consisting of the even integers. Then $2\Z$ has two cosets in $\Z$, namely the set of even integers and the set of odd integers, so the index $|\Z:2\Z|$ is 2. More generally, $|\Z:n\Z| = n$ for any positive integer n.

When G is finite, the formula may be written as $|G:H| = |G|/|H|$, and it implies Lagrange's theorem that $|H|$ divides $|G|$.

When G is infinite, $|G:H|$ is a nonzero cardinal number that may be finite or infinite. For example, $|\Z:2\Z| = 2$, but $|\R:\Z|$ is infinite.

If N is a normal subgroup of G, then $|G:N|$ is equal to the order of the quotient group $G/N$, since the underlying set of $G/N$ is the set of cosets of N in G.

== Properties ==
- If H is a subgroup of G and K is a subgroup of H, then

$$|G:K| = |G:H|\,|H:K|.$$

- If H and K are subgroups of G, then

$$|G:H\cap K| \le |G : H|\,|G : K|,$$

with equality if $HK=G$. (If $|G:H\cap K|$ is finite, then equality holds if and only if $HK=G$.)

- Equivalently, if H and K are subgroups of G, then

$$|H:H\cap K| \le |G:K|,$$

with equality if $HK=G$. (If $|H:H\cap K|$ is finite, then equality holds if and only if $HK=G$.)

- If G and H are groups and $\varphi \colon G\to H$ is a homomorphism, then the index of the kernel of $\varphi$ in G is equal to the order of the image:

$$|G:\operatorname{ker}\;\varphi|=|\operatorname{im}\;\varphi|.$$

- Let G be a group acting on a set X, and let x ∈ X. Then the cardinality of the orbit of x under G is equal to the index of the stabilizer of x:

$$|Gx| = |G:G_x|.\!$$

This is known as the orbit-stabilizer theorem.

- As a special case of the orbit-stabilizer theorem, the number of conjugates $gxg^{-1}$ of an element $x \in G$ is equal to the index of the centralizer of x in G.
- Similarly, the number of conjugates $gHg^{-1}$ of a subgroup H in G is equal to the index of the normalizer of H in G.
- If H is a subgroup of G, the index of the normal core of H satisfies the following inequality:

$$|G:\operatorname{Core}(H)| \le |G:H|!$$

where ! denotes the factorial function; this is discussed further below.
- As a corollary, if the index of H in G is 2, or for a finite group the lowest prime p that divides the order of G, then H is normal, as the index of its core must also be p, and thus H equals its core, i.e., it is normal.
- Note that a subgroup of lowest prime index may not exist, such as in any simple group of non-prime order, or more generally any perfect group.

== Examples ==
- The alternating group $A_n$ has index 2 in the symmetric group $S_n,$ and thus is normal.
- The special orthogonal group $\operatorname{SO}(n)$ has index 2 in the orthogonal group $\operatorname{O}(n)$, and thus is normal.
- The free abelian group $\Z\oplus \Z$ has three subgroups of index 2, namely

$$\{(x,y) \mid x\text{ is even}\},\quad \{(x,y) \mid y\text{ is even}\},\quad\text{and}\quad
\{(x,y) \mid x+y\text{ is even}\}$$.

- More generally, if p is prime then $\Z^n$ has $(p^n-1)/(p-1)$ subgroups of index p, corresponding to the $(p^n-1)$ nontrivial homomorphisms $\Z^n \to \Z/p\Z$.
- Similarly, the free group $F_n$ has $(p^n-1)/(p - 1)$ subgroups of index p.
- The infinite dihedral group has a cyclic subgroup of index 2, which is necessarily normal.

== Infinite index ==
If H has an infinite number of cosets in G, then the index of H in G is said to be infinite. In this case, the index $|G:H|$ is actually a cardinal number. For example, the index of H in G may be countable or uncountable, depending on whether H has a countable number of cosets in G. Note that the index of H is at most the order of G, which is realized for the trivial subgroup, or in fact any subgroup H of infinite cardinality less than that of G.

== Finite index ==
A subgroup H of finite index in a group G (finite or infinite) always contains a normal subgroup N (of G), also of finite index. In fact, if H has index n, then the index of N will be some divisor of n! and a multiple of n; indeed, N can be taken to be the kernel of the natural homomorphism from G to the permutation group of the left (or right) cosets of H. Let us explain this in more detail, using right cosets:

The elements of G that leave all cosets the same form a group.

Proof

If Hca ⊂ Hc ∀ c ∈ G and likewise Hcb ⊂ Hc ∀ c ∈ G, then Hcab ⊂ Hc ∀ c ∈ G. If h_{1}ca = h_{2}c for all c ∈ G (with h_{1}, h_{2} ∈ H) then h_{2}ca^{−1} = h_{1}c, so Hca^{−1} ⊂ Hc.

Let us call this group A. Note that A is a subgroup of H, since Ha ⊂ H by the definition of A. Let B be the set of elements of G which perform a given permutation on the cosets of H. Then B is a right coset of A.

Proof

First let us show that if b_{1}∈B, then any other element b_{2} of B equals ab_{1} for some a∈A. Assume that multiplying the coset Hc on the right by elements of B gives elements of the coset Hd. If cb_{1} = d and cb_{2} = hd, then cb_{2}b_{1}^{−1} = hc ∈ Hc, or in other words b_{2}=ab_{1} for some a∈A, as desired. Now we show that for any b∈B and a∈A, ab will be an element of B. This is because the coset Hc is the same as Hca, so Hcb = Hcab. Since this is true for any c (that is, for any coset), it shows that multiplying on the right by ab makes the same permutation of cosets as multiplying by b, and therefore ab∈B.

What we have said so far applies whether the index of H is finite or infinite. Now assume that it is the finite number n. Since the number of possible permutations of cosets is finite, namely n!, then there can only be a finite number of sets like B. (If G is infinite, then all such sets are therefore infinite.) The set of these sets forms a group isomorphic to a subset of the group of permutations, so the number of these sets must divide n!. Furthermore, it must be a multiple of n because each coset of H contains the same number of cosets of A. Finally, if for some c ∈ G and a ∈ A we have ca = xc, then for any d ∈ G dca = dxc, but also dca = hdc for some h ∈ H (by the definition of A), so hd = dx. Since this is true for any d, x must be a member of A, so ca = xc implies that cac^{−1} ∈ A and therefore A is a normal subgroup.

The index of the normal subgroup not only has to be a divisor of n!, but must satisfy other criteria as well. Since the normal subgroup is a subgroup of H, its index in G must be n times its index inside H. Its index in G must also correspond to a subgroup of the symmetric group S_{n}, the group of permutations of n objects. So for example if n is 5, the index cannot be 15 even though this divides 5!, because there is no subgroup of order 15 in S_{5}.

In the case of n = 2 this gives the rather obvious result that a subgroup H of index 2 is a normal subgroup, because the normal subgroup of H must have index 2 in G and therefore be identical to H. (We can arrive at this fact also by noting that all the elements of G that are not in H constitute the right coset of H and also the left coset, so the two are identical.) More generally, a subgroup of index p where p is the smallest prime factor of the order of G (if G is finite) is necessarily normal, as the index of N divides p! and thus must equal p, having no other prime factors. For example, the subgroup Z_{7} of the non-abelian group of order 21 is normal (see List of small non-abelian groups and Frobenius group#Examples).

An alternative proof of the result that a subgroup of index lowest prime p is normal, and other properties of subgroups of prime index are given in (Lam 2004).

=== Examples ===
The group O of chiral octahedral symmetry has 24 elements. It has a dihedral D_{4} subgroup (in fact it has three such) of order 8, and thus of index 3 in O, which we shall call H. This dihedral group has a 4-member D_{2} subgroup, which we may call A. Multiplying on the right any element of a right coset of H by an element of A gives a member of the same coset of H (Hca = Hc). A is normal in O. There are six cosets of A, corresponding to the six elements of the symmetric group S_{3}. All elements from any particular coset of A perform the same permutation of the cosets of H.

On the other hand, the group T_{h} of pyritohedral symmetry also has 24 members and a subgroup of index 3 (this time it is a D_{2h} prismatic symmetry group, see point groups in three dimensions), but in this case the whole subgroup is a normal subgroup. All members of a particular coset carry out the same permutation of these cosets, but in this case they represent only the 3-element alternating group in the 6-member S_{3} symmetric group.

== Normal subgroups of prime power index ==
Normal subgroups of prime power index are kernels of surjective maps to p-groups and have interesting structure, as described at Focal subgroup theorem: Subgroups and elaborated at focal subgroup theorem.

There are three important normal subgroups of prime power index, each being the smallest normal subgroup in a certain class:

- E^{p}(G) is the intersection of all index p normal subgroups; G/E^{p}(G) is an elementary abelian group, and is the largest elementary abelian p-group onto which G surjects.
- A^{p}(G) is the intersection of all normal subgroups K such that G/K is an abelian p-group (i.e., K is an index $p^k$ normal subgroup that contains the derived group $[G,G]$): G/A^{p}(G) is the largest abelian p-group (not necessarily elementary) onto which G surjects.
- O^{p}(G) is the intersection of all normal subgroups K of G such that G/K is a (possibly non-abelian) p-group (i.e., K is an index $p^k$ normal subgroup): G/O^{p}(G) is the largest p-group (not necessarily abelian) onto which G surjects. O^{p}(G) is also known as the p-residual subgroup.

As these are weaker conditions on the groups K, one obtains the containments

$$\mathbf{E}^p(G) \supseteq \mathbf{A}^p(G) \supseteq \mathbf{O}^p(G).$$

These groups have important connections to the Sylow subgroups and the transfer homomorphism, as discussed there.

=== Geometric structure ===
An elementary observation is that one cannot have exactly 2 subgroups of index 2, as the complement of their symmetric difference yields a third. This is a simple corollary of the above discussion (namely the projectivization of the vector space structure of the elementary abelian group

$$G/\mathbf{E}^p(G) \cong (\mathbf{Z}/p)^k$$,

and further, G does not act on this geometry, nor does it reflect any of the non-abelian structure (in both cases because the quotient is abelian).

However, it is an elementary result, which can be seen concretely as follows: the set of normal subgroups of a given index p form a projective space, namely the projective space

$$\mathbf{P}(\operatorname{Hom}(G,\mathbf{Z}/p)).$$

In detail, the space of homomorphisms from G to the (cyclic) group of order p, $\operatorname{Hom}(G,\mathbf{Z}/p),$ is a vector space over the finite field $\mathbf{F}_p = \mathbf{Z}/p.$ A non-trivial such map has as kernel a normal subgroup of index p, and multiplying the map by an element of $(\mathbf{Z}/p)^\times$ (a non-zero number mod p) does not change the kernel; thus one obtains a map from

$$\mathbf{P}(\operatorname{Hom}(G,\mathbf{Z}/p)) :=  (\operatorname{Hom}(G,\mathbf{Z}/p))\setminus\{0\})/(\mathbf{Z}/p)^\times$$

to normal index p subgroups. Conversely, a normal subgroup of index p determines a non-trivial map to $\mathbf{Z}/p$ up to a choice of "which coset maps to $1 \in \mathbf{Z}/p,$ which shows that this map is a bijection.

As a consequence, the number of normal subgroups of index p is

$$(p^{k+1}-1)/(p-1)=1+p+\cdots+p^k$$

for some k; $k=-1$ corresponds to no normal subgroups of index p. Further, given two distinct normal subgroups of index p, one obtains a projective line consisting of $p+1$ such subgroups.

For $p=2,$ the symmetric difference of two distinct index 2 subgroups (which are necessarily normal) gives the third point on the projective line containing these subgroups, and a group must contain $0,1,3,7,15,\ldots$ index 2 subgroups – it cannot contain exactly 2 or 4 index 2 subgroups, for instance.

== See also ==
- Virtually
- Codimension
