= Acyclic space =

In mathematics, an acyclic space is a nonempty topological space X in which cycles are always boundaries, in the sense of homology theory. This implies that integral homology groups in all dimensions of X are isomorphic to the corresponding homology groups of a point.

In other words, using the idea of reduced homology,

$$\tilde{H}_i(X)=0, \quad \forall  i\ge -1.$$

It is common to consider such a space as a nonempty space without "holes"; for example, a circle or a sphere is not acyclic but a disc or a ball is acyclic. This condition however is weaker than asking that every closed loop in the space would bound a disc in the space, all we ask is that any closed loop—and higher dimensional analogue thereof—would bound something like a "two-dimensional surface." The condition of acyclicity on a space X implies, for example, for nice spaces—say, simplicial complexes—that any continuous map of X to the circle or to the higher spheres is null-homotopic.

If a space X is contractible, then it is also acyclic, by the homotopy invariance of homology. The converse is not true, in general. Nevertheless, if X is an acyclic CW complex, and if the fundamental group of X is trivial, then X is a contractible space, as follows from the Whitehead theorem and the Hurewicz theorem.

== Examples ==
Acyclic spaces occur in topology, where they can be used to construct other, more interesting topological spaces.

For instance, if one removes a single point from a manifold M which is a homology sphere, one gets such a space. The homotopy groups of an acyclic space X do not vanish in general, because the fundamental group $\pi_1(X)$ need not be trivial. For example, the punctured Poincaré homology sphere is an acyclic, 3-dimensional manifold which is not contractible.

This gives a repertoire of examples, since the first homology group is the abelianization of the fundamental group. With every perfect group G one can associate a (canonical, terminal) acyclic space, whose fundamental group is a central extension of the given group G.

The homotopy groups of these associated acyclic spaces are closely related to Quillen's plus construction on the classifying space BG.

== Acyclic groups ==
An acyclic group is a group G whose classifying space BG is acyclic; in other words, all its (reduced) homology groups vanish, i.e., $\tilde{H}_i(G;\mathbf{Z})=0$, for all $i\ge 0$. Every acyclic group is thus a perfect group, meaning its first homology group vanishes: $H_1(G;\mathbf{Z})=0$, and in fact, a superperfect group, meaning the first two homology groups vanish: $H_1(G;\mathbf{Z})=H_2(G;\mathbf{Z})=0$. The converse is not true: the binary icosahedral group is superperfect (hence perfect) but not acyclic.

== See also ==
- Aspherical space
