= Higman–Sims asymptotic formula =

Asymptotic estimate in group theory

In finite group theory, the Higman–Sims asymptotic formula gives an asymptotic estimate on number of groups of prime power order.

== Statement ==
Let $p$ be a (fixed) prime number. Define $f(n,p)$ as the number of isomorphism classes of groups of order $p^n$. Then:

$$f(n,p) = p^{\frac{2}{27}n^3 + \mathcal O(n^{8/3})}$$

Here, the big-O notation is with respect to $n$, not with respect to $p$ (the constant under the big-O notation may depend on $p$).
