= Perfect group =

Mathematical group with trivial abelianization

In mathematics, specifically in group theory, a group is said to be perfect if it equals its own commutator subgroup (i.e., has trivial abelianization); equivalently, if the group has no non-trivial abelian quotients.

== Examples ==
The smallest (non-trivial) perfect group is the alternating group $A_5$. More generally, any non-abelian simple group is perfect since the commutator subgroup is a normal subgroup with abelian quotient. However, a perfect group need not be simple; for example, the special linear group over the field with 5 elements, SL(2,5) (or the binary icosahedral group, which is isomorphic to it) is perfect but not simple: it has a non-trivial center containing

$$\begin{pmatrix}-1 & 0 \\ 0 & -1\end{pmatrix} = \begin{pmatrix}4 & 0 \\ 0 & 4\end{pmatrix}$$.

The direct product of any two simple non-abelian groups is perfect but not simple; the commutator of two elements is

$$[(a,b)(c,d)] = ([a,c],[b,d])$$.

Since commutators in each simple group form a generating set, pairs of commutators form a generating set of the direct product.

The fundamental group of $\operatorname{SO}(3)/I_{60}$ is a perfect group of order 120.

More generally, a quasisimple group (a perfect central extension of a simple group) that is a non-trivial extension (and therefore not a simple group itself) is perfect but not simple; this includes all the insoluble non-simple finite special linear groups $\operatorname{SL}(n,q)$ as extensions of the projective special linear group $\operatorname{PSL}(n,q)$ (indeed, $\operatorname{SL}(2,5)$ is an extension of $\operatorname{PSL}(2,5)$, which is isomorphic to A_{5}). Similarly, the special linear group over the real and complex numbers is perfect, but the general linear group $\operatorname{GL}$ is never perfect (except when trivial or over $\mathbb{F}_2$, where it equals the special linear group), as the determinant gives a non-trivial abelianization and indeed the commutator subgroup is $\operatorname{SL}$.

A non-trivial perfect group, however, is necessarily not solvable; and 4 divides its order (if finite), moreover, if 8 does not divide the order, then 3 does.

Any quotient of a perfect group is perfect. A non-trivial finite perfect group that is not simple must then be an extension of at least one smaller simple non-abelian group. But it can be the extension of more than one simple group. In fact, the direct product of perfect groups is also perfect.

Every perfect group $G$ determines another perfect group $E$ (its universal central extension) together with a surjection $f : E \to G$ whose kernel is in the center of $E$, such that $f$ is universal with this property. The kernel of $f$ is called the Schur multiplier of $G$ because it was first studied by Issai Schur in 1904; it is isomorphic to the homology group $H_2(G)$.

In the plus construction of algebraic K-theory, if we consider the group $\operatorname{GL}(A) = \text{colim} \operatorname{GL}_n(A)$ for a commutative ring $A$, then the subgroup of elementary matrices $E(R)$ forms a perfect subgroup.

== Ore's conjecture ==
As the commutator subgroup is generated by commutators, a perfect group may contain elements that are products of commutators but not themselves commutators. Øystein Ore showed in 1951 that the alternating groups on five or more elements contained only commutators, and conjectured that this was so for all the non-abelian finite simple groups. Ore's conjecture was finally proven in 2008. The proof relies on the classification theorem.

== Grün's lemma ==
A basic fact about perfect groups is Grün's lemma, due to Otto Grün. It states that the quotient of a perfect group by its center is centerless (has trivial center).

Proof: If $G$ is a perfect group, let $Z_1$ and $Z_2$ denote the first two terms of the upper central series of $G$ (i.e., $Z_1$ is the center of $G$, and $Z_2/Z_1$ is the center of $G/Z_1$). If $H$ and $K$ are subgroups of $G$, denote the commutator of $H$ and $K$ by $[H,K]$ and note that $[Z_1, G]=1$ and $[Z_2,G] \subseteq Z_1$, and consequently

$$\quad[Z_2,G,G] = [[Z_2,G],G] \subseteq [Z_1,G] = 1,$$
$$[G,Z_2,G] = [[G,Z_2],G] = [[Z_2,G],G] \subseteq [Z_1,G] = 1.$$

By the three subgroups lemma (or equivalently, by the Hall-Witt identity), it follows that

$$[G, Z_2] = [[G,G], Z_2] = [G, G, Z_2] = 1.$$

Therefore $Z_2 \subseteq Z_1 = Z(G)$, and thus the center of the quotient group $G/Z(G)$ is the trivial group.

As a consequence, all higher centers (that is, higher terms in the upper central series) of a perfect group equal the center.

== Group homology ==
In terms of group homology, a perfect group is precisely one whose first homology group vanishes: $H_1(G,\Z)=0$. Indeed, the first homology group of a group is exactly the abelianization of the group, and perfect groups are by definition those with trivial abelianization. An advantage of this definition is that it admits strengthening:

=== Superperfect groups ===
A superperfect group is one whose first two homology groups vanish:

$$H_1(G,\Z)=H_2(G,\Z)=0$$.

A finite perfect group is superperfect if and only if it is its own universal central extension (UCE), as the second homology group of a perfect group parametrizes central extensions.

A notable example is this: if $G$ is the fundamental group of a homology sphere, then $G$ is superperfect. The smallest finite, non-trivial superperfect group is the binary icosahedral group (the fundamental group of the Poincaré homology sphere).

The alternating group $A_5$ is perfect but not superperfect: it has a non-trivial central extension, the binary icosahedral group, which is superperfect (and is in fact its UCE). In fact, for $n\geq 5$, the alternating group $A_n$ is perfect but not superperfect, with $H_2(A_n,\Z) = \Z/2$ for $n \geq 8$.

More generally, the projective special linear groups $\operatorname{PSL}(n,q)$ are simple (hence perfect) except for $\operatorname{PSL}(2,2)$ and $\operatorname{PSL}(2,3)$, but not superperfect, with the special linear groups $\operatorname{SL}(n,q)$ as central extensions. This family includes the binary icosahedral group as UCE of $A_5$.

=== Acyclic groups ===
An acyclic group $G$ is one for which all (reduced) homology groups vanish: $\tilde H_i(G;\Z) = 0$ for $i\geq 0$. (This is equivalent to all homology groups other than $H_0$ vanishing.) Equivalently, its classifying space $BG$ is an acyclic space.

Every acyclic group is superperfect, but the converse is not true: the binary icosahedral group is superperfect, but not acyclic.

== Quasi-perfect group ==
In algebraic K-theory, a group is said to be quasi-perfect if its commutator subgroup is perfect; formally, a quasi-perfect group $G$ satisfies $G^{(1)} = G^{(2)}$ (the commutator of the commutator subgroup is the commutator subgroup), while a perfect group is one such that $G^{(1)}=G$ (the commutator subgroup is the whole group).

- Berrick, A. J.; Hillman, J. A. (2003). "Perfect and acyclic subgroups of finitely presentable groups". Journal of the London Mathematical Society. 2. 68 (3): 683–698. doi:10.1112/S0024610703004587. MR 2009444.
- Grün, Otto (1935). "Beiträge zur Gruppentheorie. I.". Journal für die reine und angewandte Mathematik (in German). 174: 1–14. doi:10.1515/crll.1936.174.1. Zbl 0012.34102.
- Inassaridze, Hvedri (1995). Algebraic K-Theory. Mathematics and Its Applications. Vol. 311. Dordrecht: Springer. ISBN 978-0-7923-3185-8. MR 1368402.
- Karoubi, Max (1973). "Périodicité de la K-théorie hermitienne". In Bass, Hyman (ed.). Algebraic K-Theory III (Seattle, 1972). Lecture Notes in Mathematics (in French). Vol. 343. Berlin, Heidelberg: Springer. pp. 301–411. ISBN 978-3-540-06436-7.
- Milnor, John (2006). "The Poincaré conjecture". In Carlson, James; Jaffe, Arthur; Wiles, Andrew (eds.). The Millennium Prize Problems. Providence, RI: American Mathematical Society. pp. 71–86. ISBN 978-0-8218-3679-8.
- Rose, John S. (1994) [1978]. A Course on Group Theory (reprint ed.). Mineola, NY: Dover. ISBN 978-0-486-68194-8. MR 1298629. Zbl 848.20001.
