= Central series =

Normal series of subgroups which indicate almost-commutativity

In mathematics, especially in the fields of group theory and Lie theory, a central series is a kind of normal series of subgroups or Lie subalgebras, expressing the idea that the commutator is nearly trivial. For groups, the existence of a central series means it is a nilpotent group; for matrix rings (considered as Lie algebras), it means that in some basis the ring consists entirely of upper triangular matrices with constant diagonal.

This article uses the language of group theory; analogous terms are used for Lie algebras.

A general group possesses a lower central series and upper central series (also called the descending central series and ascending central series, respectively), but these are central series in the strict sense (terminating in the trivial subgroup) if and only if the group is nilpotent. A related but distinct construction is the derived series, which terminates in the trivial subgroup whenever the group is solvable.

== Definition ==
A central series is a sequence of subgroups

$$\{1\} = A_0 \triangleleft A_1 \triangleleft \dots \triangleleft A_n = G$$

such that the successive quotients are central; that is, $[G, A_{i+1}] \le A_{i}$, where $[G,H]$ denotes the commutator subgroup generated by all elements of the form $[g,h] = g^{-1}h^{-1}gh$, with g in G and h in H. Since $[G,A_{i+1}] \le A_i \le A_{i+1}$, the subgroup $A_{i+1}$ is normal in G for each i. Thus, we can rephrase the 'central' condition above as: $A_{i}$ is normal in G and $A_{i+1}/A_{i}$ is central in $G/A_{i}$ for each i. As a consequence, $A_{i+1}/A_{i}$ is abelian for each i.

A central series is analogous in Lie theory to a flag that is strictly preserved by the adjoint action (more prosaically, a basis in which each element is represented by a strictly upper triangular matrix); compare Engel's theorem.

A group need not have a central series. In fact, a group has a central series if and only if it is a nilpotent group. If a group has a central series, then there are two central series whose terms are extremal in certain senses. Since A_{0} = {1}, the center Z(G) satisfies A_{1} ≤ Z(G). Therefore, the maximal choice for A_{1} is A_{1} = Z(G). Continuing in this way to choose the largest possible A_{i + 1} given A_{i} produces what is called the upper central series. Dually, since A_{n} = G, the commutator subgroup [G, G] satisfies [G, G] = [G, A_{n}] ≤ A_{n − 1}. Therefore, the minimal choice for A_{n − 1} is [G, G]. Continuing to choose A_{i} minimally given A_{i + 1} such that [G, A_{i + 1}] ≤ A_{i} produces what is called the lower central series. These series can be constructed for any group, and if a group has a central series (is a nilpotent group), these procedures will yield central series.

== Lower central series ==
The lower central series (or descending central series) of a group $G$ is the descending series of subgroups

$$G=G_1\trianglerighteq G_2\trianglerighteq\cdots\trianglerighteq G_n\trianglerighteq\cdots$$,

where, for each $n$,

$$G_{n+1} = [G_n,G]$$,

the subgroup of $G$ generated by all commutators $[x,y]$ with $x \in G_n$ and $y \in G$. Thus, $G_2 = [G,G] = G^{(1)}$, the derived subgroup of $G$, while $G_3 = [[G,G],G]$, etc. The lower central series is often denoted $\gamma_n(G) = G_n$. We say the series terminates or stabilizes when $G_n=G_{n+1}=G_{n+2}=\cdots$, and the smallest such $n$ is one more than the length of the series.

This should not be confused with the derived series, whose terms are

$$G^{(n)} := [G^{(n-1)},G^{(n-1)}]$$,

not $G_{n} = [G_{n-1},G]$. The two series are related by $G^{(n)} \le G_n$. For instance, the symmetric group $S_3$ is solvable of class 2: the derived series is

$$S_3\trianglerighteq \{e,(1\;2\;3),(1\;3\;2)\}\trianglerighteq \{e\}.$$

However, it is not nilpotent: its lower central series

$$S_3\trianglerighteq \{e,(1\;2\;3),(1\;3\;2)\}$$

does not terminate in $\{e\}$. A nilpotent group is a solvable group, and its derived length is logarithmic in its nilpotency class (Schenkman 1975, p. 201,216).

For infinite groups, one can continue the lower central series to infinite ordinal numbers via transfinite recursion: for a limit ordinal λ, define

$$G_{\lambda} =\bigcap \{ G_{\alpha} : \alpha < \lambda\}$$.

If $G_{\lambda} = 1$ for some ordinal λ, then G is said to be a hypocentral group. For every ordinal λ, there is a group G such that $G_{\lambda} = 1$, but $G_{\alpha} \ne 1$ for all $\alpha < \lambda$, (Malcev 1949).

If $\omega$ is the first infinite ordinal, then $G_{\omega}$ is the smallest normal subgroup of G such that the quotient is residually nilpotent, that is, such that every non-identity element has a non-identity homomorphic image in a nilpotent group (Schenkman 1975, p. 175,183). In the field of combinatorial group theory, it is an important and early result that free groups are residually nilpotent. In fact the quotients of the lower central series are free abelian groups with a natural basis defined by basic commutators, (Hall 1959, Ch. 11).

If $G_{\omega}=G_n$ for some finite n, then $G_{\omega}$ is the smallest normal subgroup of G with nilpotent quotient, and $G_{\omega}$ is called the nilpotent residual of G. This is always the case for a finite group, and defines the $F_1(G)$ term in the lower Fitting series for G.

If $G_{\omega}\ne G_n$ for all finite n, then $G/G_{\omega}$ is not nilpotent, but it is residually nilpotent.

There is no general term for the intersection of all terms of the transfinite lower central series, analogous to the hypercenter (below).

== Upper central series ==
The upper central series (or ascending central series) of a group G is the sequence of subgroups

$$1 = Z_0 \triangleleft Z_1 \triangleleft \cdots \triangleleft Z_i \triangleleft \cdots,$$

where each successive group is defined by:

$$Z_{i+1} = \{x\in G \mid \forall y\in G:[x,y] \in Z_i \}$$

and is called the ith center of G (respectively, second center, third center, etc.). In this case, $Z_1$ is the center of G, and for each successive group, the factor group $Z_{i+ 1}/Z_i$ is the center of $G/Z_i$, and is called an upper central series quotient. Again, we say the series terminates if it stabilizes into a chain of equalities, and its length is the number of distinct groups in it.

For infinite groups, one can continue the upper central series to infinite ordinal numbers via transfinite recursion: for a limit ordinal λ, define

$$Z_\lambda(G) = \bigcup_{\alpha < \lambda} Z_\alpha(G).$$

The limit of this process (the union of the higher centers) is called the hypercenter of the group.

If the transfinite upper central series stabilizes at the whole group, then the group is called hypercentral. Hypercentral groups enjoy many properties of nilpotent groups, such as the normalizer condition (the normalizer of a proper subgroup properly contains the subgroup), elements of coprime order commute, and periodic hypercentral groups are the direct sum of their Sylow p-subgroups (Schenkman 1975, Ch. VI.3). For every ordinal λ there is a group G with Z_{λ}(G) = G, but Z_{α}(G) ≠ G for α < λ, (Gluškov 1952) and (McLain 1956).

== Connection between lower and upper central series ==
There are various connections between the lower central series (LCS) and upper central series (UCS) (Ellis 2001), particularly for nilpotent groups.

For a nilpotent group, the lengths of the LCS and the UCS agree, and this length is called the nilpotency class of the group. However, the LCS and UCS of a nilpotent group may not necessarily have the same terms. For example, while the UCS and LCS agree for the cyclic group C_{2} ⊵ {e} and quaternion group Q_{8} ⊵ {1, −1} ⊵ {1}, the UCS and LCS of their direct product C_{2} × Q_{8} do not agree: its LCS is C_{2} × Q_{8} ⊵ {e} × {−1, 1} ⊵ {e} × {1}, while its UCS is C_{2} × Q_{8} ⊵ C_{2} × {−1, 1} ⊵ {e} × {1}.

A group is abelian if and only if the LCS terminates at the first step (the commutator subgroup is the trivial subgroup), if and only if the UCS terminates at the first step (the center is the entire group).

By contrast, the LCS terminates at the zeroth step if and only if the group is perfect (the commutator is the entire group), while the UCS terminates at the zeroth step if and only if the group is centerless (trivial center), which are distinct concepts. For a perfect group, the UCS always stabilizes by the first step (Grün's lemma). However, a centerless group may have a very long LCS: a free group on two or more generators is centerless, but its LCS does not stabilize until the first infinite ordinal. This shows that the lengths of the LCS and UCS need not agree in general.

== Refined central series ==
In the study of p-groups (which are always nilpotent), it is often important to use longer central series. An important class of such central series are the exponent-p central series; that is, a central series whose quotients are elementary abelian groups, or what is the same, have exponent p. There is a unique most quickly descending such series, the lower exponent-p central series λ defined by:

$\lambda_1(G) = G$, and
$$\lambda_{n+1}(G)  = [G, \lambda_n(G)] (\lambda_n(G))^p$$.

The second term, $\lambda_2(G)$, is equal to $[G, G]G^p = \Phi(G)$, the Frattini subgroup. The lower exponent-p central series is sometimes simply called the p-central series.

There is a unique most quickly ascending such series, the upper exponent-p central series S defined by:

S_{0}(G) = 1
S_{n+1}(G)/S_{n}(G) = Ω(Z(G/S_{n}(G)))

where Ω(Z(H)) denotes the subgroup generated by (and equal to) the set of central elements of H of order dividing p. The first term, S_{1}(G), is the subgroup generated by the minimal normal subgroups and so is equal to the socle of G. For this reason the upper exponent-p central series is sometimes known as the socle series or even the Loewy series, though the latter is usually used to indicate a descending series.

Sometimes other refinements of the central series are useful, such as the Jennings series κ defined by:

κ_{1}(G) = G, and
κ_{n + 1}(G) = [G, κ_{n}(G)] (κ_{i}(G))^{p}, where i is the smallest integer larger than or equal to n/p.

The Jennings series is named after Stephen Arthur Jennings who used the series to describe the Loewy series of the modular group ring of a p-group.

== See also ==
- Nilpotent series, an analogous concept for solvable groups
- Parent-descendant relations for finite p-groups defined by various kinds of central series
- Unipotent group
