= Elementary abelian group =

Commutative group in which all nonzero elements have the same order

In mathematics, specifically in group theory, an elementary abelian group is an abelian group in which all elements other than the identity have the same order. This common order must be a prime number, and the elementary abelian groups in which the common order is p are a particular kind of p-group. A group for which p = 2 (that is, an elementary abelian 2-group) is sometimes called a Boolean group.

Every elementary abelian p-group is a vector space over the prime field with p elements, and conversely every such vector space is an elementary abelian group. By the classification of finitely generated abelian groups, or by the fact that every vector space has a basis, every finite elementary abelian group must be of the form (Z/pZ)^{n} for n a non-negative integer (sometimes called the group's rank). Here, Z/pZ denotes the cyclic group of order p (or equivalently the integers mod p), and the superscript notation means the n-fold direct product of groups.

In general, a (possibly infinite) elementary abelian p-group is a direct sum of cyclic groups of order p. (Note that in the finite case the direct product and direct sum coincide, but this is not so in the infinite case.)

== Examples and properties ==
- The elementary abelian group (Z/2Z)^{2} has four elements: {(0,0), (0,1), (1,0), (1,1)} . Addition is performed componentwise, taking the result modulo 2. For instance, (1,0) + (1,1) = (0,1). This is in fact the Klein four-group.
- In the group generated by the symmetric difference on a (not necessarily finite) set, every element has order 2. Any such group is necessarily abelian because, since every element is its own inverse, xy = (xy)^{−1} = y^{−1}x^{−1} = yx. Such a group (also called a Boolean group), generalizes the Klein four-group example to an arbitrary number of components.
- (Z/pZ)^{n} is generated by n elements, and n is the least possible number of generators. In particular, the set {e_{1}, ..., e_{n}} , where e_{i} has a 1 in the ith component and 0 elsewhere, is a minimal generating set.
- Every finite elementary abelian group has a fairly simple finite presentation:
  $$(\mathbb Z/p\mathbb Z)^n \cong \langle e_1,\ldots,e_n\mid e_i^p = 1,\  e_i e_j = e_j e_i \rangle$$

== Vector space structure ==
Suppose V $\cong$ (Z/pZ)^{n} is a finite elementary abelian group. Since Z/pZ $\cong$ F_{p}, the finite field of p elements, we have V $\cong$ (Z/pZ)^{n} $\cong$ F_{p}^{n}, hence V can be considered as an n-dimensional vector space over the field F_{p}. Note that an elementary abelian group does not in general have a distinguished basis: choice of isomorphism V $\overset{\cong}{\to}$ (Z/pZ)^{n} corresponds to a choice of basis.

To the observant reader, it may appear that F_{p}^{n} has more structure than the group V, in particular that it has scalar multiplication in addition to (vector/group) addition. However, V as an abelian group has a unique Z-module structure where the action of Z corresponds to repeated addition, and this Z-module structure is consistent with the F_{p} scalar multiplication. That is, c⋅g = g + g + ... + g (c times) where c in F_{p} (considered as an integer with 0 ≤ c < p) gives V a natural F_{p}-module structure.

== Automorphism group ==
As a finite-dimensional vector space V has a basis {e_{1}, ..., e_{n}} as described in the examples, if we take {v_{1}, ..., v_{n}} to be any n elements of V, then by linear algebra we have that the mapping T(e_{i}) = v_{i} extends uniquely to a linear transformation of V. Each such T can be considered as a group homomorphism from V to V (an endomorphism) and likewise any endomorphism of V can be considered as a linear transformation of V as a vector space.

If we restrict our attention to automorphisms of V we have Aut(V) = { T : V → V | ker T = 0 } = GL_{n}(F_{p}), the general linear group of n × n invertible matrices on F_{p}.

The automorphism group GL(V) = GL_{n}(F_{p}) acts transitively on V \ {0} (as is true for any vector space). This in fact characterizes elementary abelian groups among all finite groups: if G is a finite group with identity e such that Aut(G) acts transitively on G \ {e}, then G is elementary abelian. (Proof: if Aut(G) acts transitively on G \ {e}, then all nonidentity elements of G have the same (necessarily prime) order. Then G is a p-group. It follows that G has a nontrivial center, which is necessarily invariant under all automorphisms, and thus equals all of G.)

== A generalisation to higher orders ==
It can also be of interest to go beyond prime order components to prime-power order. Consider an elementary abelian group G to be of type (p,p,...,p) for some prime p. A homocyclic group (of rank n) is an abelian group of type (m,m,...,m) i.e. the direct product of n isomorphic cyclic groups of order m, of which groups of type (p^{k},p^{k},...,p^{k}) are a special case.

== Related groups ==
The extra special groups are extensions of elementary abelian groups by a cyclic group of order p, and are analogous to the Heisenberg group.

== See also ==
- Elementary group
- Hamming space
