= Nilpotent group =

Type of mathematical group

In mathematics, specifically group theory, a nilpotent group is a group that has an upper central series that terminates with itself. Equivalently, it has a central series of finite length, or its lower central series terminates with the trivial group.

Intuitively, a nilpotent group is a group that is "almost abelian". This idea is motivated by the fact that nilpotent groups are solvable, and for finite nilpotent groups, two elements having relatively prime orders must commute. It is also true that finite nilpotent groups are supersolvable. The concept was introduced in the 1930s by Russian mathematician Sergei Chernikov.

Nilpotent groups arise in Galois theory, as well as in the classification of groups. They also appear prominently in the classification of Lie groups. The concept has been adapted to the theory of Lie algebras (using the Lie bracket).

== Definition ==
The definition uses the idea of a central series for a group. The following are equivalent definitions for a nilpotent group $G$:

- $G$ has a central series of finite length. That is, a series of normal subgroups
  $$\{1\} = G_0 \triangleleft G_1 \triangleleft \dots \triangleleft G_n = G$$
  where $G_{i+1}/G_i \leq Z(G/G_i)$, or equivalently $[G,G_{i+1}] \leq G_i$.
- $G$ has a lower central series terminating in the trivial group after finitely many steps. That is, a series of normal subgroups
  $$G = G_0 \triangleright G_1 \triangleright \dots \triangleright G_n = \{1\}$$
  where $G_{i+1} = [G_i, G]$.
- G has an upper central series terminating in the whole group after finitely many steps. That is, a series of normal subgroups
  $$\{1\} = Z_0 \triangleleft Z_1 \triangleleft \dots \triangleleft Z_n = G$$
  where $Z_1 = Z(G)$ and $Z_{i+1}$ is the subgroup such that $Z_{i+1}/Z_i = Z(G/Z_i)$.

For a nilpotent group, the smallest $n$ such that $G$ has a central series of length $n$ is called the nilpotency class of $G$; and $G$ is said to be nilpotent of class n. (By definition, the length is $n$ if there are $n + 1$ different subgroups in the series, including the trivial subgroup and the whole group.)

Equivalently, the nilpotency class of $G$ equals the length of the lower central series or upper central series. If a group has nilpotency class at most $n$, then it is sometimes called a nil-n group.

It follows immediately from any of the above forms of the definition of nilpotency that the trivial group is the unique group of nilpotency class 0, and groups of nilpotency class 1 are exactly the non-trivial abelian groups.

== Examples ==
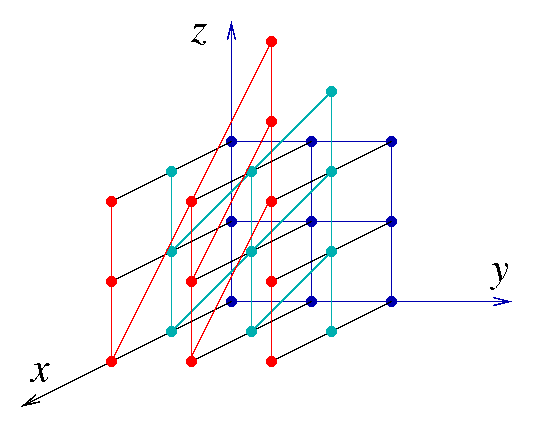
A portion of the Cayley graph of the discrete Heisenberg group, a well-known nilpotent group.

- As noted above, every abelian group is nilpotent.
- For a small non-abelian example, consider the quaternion group Q_{8}, which is a smallest non-abelian p-group. It has center {1, −1} of order 2, and its upper central series is {1}, {1, −1}, Q_{8}; so it is nilpotent of class 2.
- The direct product of two nilpotent groups is nilpotent.
- All finite p-groups are in fact nilpotent (proof). For n > 1, the maximal nilpotency class of a group of order p^{n} is n - 1 (for example, a group of order p^{2} is abelian). The 2-groups of maximal class are the generalised quaternion groups, the dihedral groups, and the semidihedral groups.
- Furthermore, every finite nilpotent group is the direct product of p-groups.
- The multiplicative group of upper unitriangular n × n matrices over any field F is a nilpotent group of nilpotency class n − 1. In particular, taking n = 3 yields the Heisenberg group H, an example of a non-abelian infinite nilpotent group. It has nilpotency class 2 with central series 1, Z(H), H.
- The multiplicative group of invertible upper triangular n × n matrices over a field F is not in general nilpotent, but is solvable.
- Any nonabelian group G such that G/Z(G) is abelian has nilpotency class 2, with central series {1}, Z(G), G.

The natural numbers k for which any group of order k is nilpotent have been characterized (sequence A056867 in the OEIS).

== Explanation of term ==
Nilpotent groups are called so because the "adjoint action" of any element is nilpotent, meaning that for a nilpotent group $G$ of nilpotence degree $n$ and an element $g$, the function $\operatorname{ad}_g \colon G \to G$ defined by $\operatorname{ad}_g(x) := [g,x]$ (where $[g,x]=g^{-1} x^{-1} g x$ is the commutator of $g$ and $x$) is nilpotent in the sense that the $n$th iteration of the function is trivial: $\left(\operatorname{ad}_g\right)^n(x)=e$ for all $x$ in $G$.

This is not a defining characteristic of nilpotent groups: groups for which $\operatorname{ad}_g$ is nilpotent of degree $n$ (in the sense above) are called $n$-Engel groups, (Note: For the term, compare Engel's theorem, also on nilpotency.) and need not be nilpotent in general. They are proven to be nilpotent if they have finite order, and are conjectured to be nilpotent as long as they are finitely generated.

An abelian group is precisely one for which the adjoint action is not just nilpotent but trivial (a 1-Engel group).

== Properties ==
Since each successive factor group Z_{i+1}/Z_{i} in the upper central series is abelian, and the series is finite, every nilpotent group is a solvable group with a relatively simple structure.

Every subgroup of a nilpotent group of class $n$ is nilpotent of class at most $n$; in addition, if $f$ is a homomorphism of a nilpotent group of class $n$, then the image of $f$ is nilpotent of class at most $n$.

Theorem—

The following statements are equivalent for finite groups, revealing some useful properties of nilpotency:
1. G is a nilpotent group.
2. If H is a proper subgroup of G, then H is a proper normal subgroup of N_{G}(H) (the normalizer of H in G). This is called the normalizer property and can be phrased simply as "normalizers grow".
3. Every Sylow subgroup of G is normal.
4. G is the direct product of its Sylow subgroups.
5. If d divides the order of G, then G has a normal subgroup of order d.
Proof

(a)→(b)
By induction on |G|. If G is abelian, then for any H, N_{G}(H) = G. If not, if Z(G) is not contained in H, then h_{Z}H_{Z}^{−1}h^{−1} = h'H'h^{−1} = H, so H·Z(G) normalizers H. If Z(G) is contained in H, then H/Z(G) is contained in G/Z(G). Note, G/Z(G) is a nilpotent group. Thus, there exists a subgroup of G/Z(G) which normalizes H/Z(G) and H/Z(G) is a proper subgroup of it. Therefore, pullback this subgroup to the subgroup in G and it normalizes H. (This proof is the same argument as for p-groups – the only fact we needed was if G is nilpotent then so is G/Z(G) – so the details are omitted.)
(b)→(c)
Let p_{1},p_{2},...,p_{s} be the distinct primes dividing its order and let P_{i} in Syl_{p_{i}}(G), 1 ≤ i ≤ s. Let P = P_{i} for some i and let N = N_{G}(P). Since P is a normal Sylow subgroup of N, P is characteristic in N. Since P char N and N is a normal subgroup of N_{G}(N), we get that P is a normal subgroup of N_{G}(N). This means N_{G}(N) is a subgroup of N and hence N_{G}(N) = N. By (b) we must therefore have N = G, which gives (c).
(c)→(d)
Let p_{1},p_{2},...,p_{s} be the distinct primes dividing its order and let P_{i} in Syl_{p_{i}}(G), 1 ≤ i ≤ s. For any t, 1 ≤ t ≤ s we show inductively that P_{1}P_{2}···P_{t} is isomorphic to P_{1}×P_{2}×···×P_{t}.
Note first that each P_{i} is normal in G so P_{1}P_{2}···P_{t} is a subgroup of G. Let H be the product P_{1}P_{2}···P_{t−1} and let K = P_{t}, so by induction H is isomorphic to P_{1}×P_{2}×···×P_{t−1}. In particular, |H| = |P_{1}|⋅|P_{2}|⋅···⋅|P_{t−1}|. Since |K| = |P_{t}|, the orders of H and K are relatively prime. Lagrange's Theorem implies the intersection of H and K is equal to 1. By definition, P_{1}P_{2}···P_{t} = HK, hence HK is isomorphic to H×K which is equal to P_{1}×P_{2}×···×P_{t}. This completes the induction. Now take t = s to obtain (d).
(d)→(e)
Note that a p-group of order p^{k} has a normal subgroup of order p^{m} for all 1≤m≤k. Since G is a direct product of its Sylow subgroups, and normality is preserved upon direct product of groups, G has a normal subgroup of order d for every divisor d of |G|.
(e)→(a)
For any prime p dividing |G|, the Sylow p-subgroup is normal. Thus we can apply (d) (since we already proved (c)→(d)). Because every finite p-group is nilpotent, inffer G (a product of p-groups) is nilpotent.

Statement (d) can be extended to infinite groups: if G is a nilpotent group, then every Sylow subgroup G_{p} of G is normal, and the direct product of these Sylow subgroups is the subgroup of all elements of finite order in G (see torsion subgroup).

Many properties of nilpotent groups are shared by hypercentral groups.
