= Order (group theory) =

Cardinality of a mathematical group, or of the subgroup generated by an element

Examples of transformations with different orders: 90° rotation with order 4, shearing with infinite order, and their compositions with order 3.

In mathematics, the order of a finite group is the number of its elements. If a group is not finite, one says that its order is infinite.

The order of an element of a group (also called period length or period) is the order of the subgroup generated by the element. If the group operation is denoted as a multiplication, the order of an element a of a group, is thus the smallest positive integer m such that a^{m} = e, where e denotes the identity element of the group, and a^{m} denotes the product of m copies of a. If no such m exists, the order of a is infinite.

The order of a group G is denoted by ord(G) or |G|, and the order of an element a is denoted by ord(a) or |a|, instead of $\operatorname{ord}(\langle a\rangle),$ where the brackets denote the generated group.

Lagrange's theorem states that for any subgroup H of a finite group G, the order of the subgroup divides the order of the group; that is, |H| is a divisor of |G|. In particular, the order |a| of any element is a divisor of |G|.

== Example ==
The symmetric group S_{3} has the following multiplication table.

•	e	s	t	u	v	w
e	e	s	t	u	v	w
s	s	e	v	w	t	u
t	t	u	e	s	w	v
u	u	t	w	v	e	s
v	v	w	s	e	u	t
w	w	v	u	t	s	e

This group has six elements, so ord(S_{3}) = 6. By definition, the order of the identity, e, is one, since e ^{1} = e. Each of s, t, and w squares to e, so these group elements have order two: |s| = |t| = |w| = 2. Finally, u and v have order 3, since u^{3} = vu = e, and v^{3} = uv = e.

== Order and structure ==
The order of a group G and the orders of its elements give much information about the structure of the group. Roughly speaking, the more complicated the factorization of |G|, the more complicated the structure of G.

For |G| = 1, the group is trivial. In any group, only the identity element a = e has ord(a) = 1. If every non-identity element in G is equal to its inverse (so that a^{2} = e), then ord(a) = 2; this implies G is abelian since $ab=(ab)^{-1}=b^{-1}a^{-1}=ba$. The converse is not true; for example, the (additive) cyclic group Z_{6} of integers modulo 6 is abelian, but the number 2 has order 3:

$$2+2+2=6 \equiv 0 \pmod {6}$$.

The relationship between the two concepts of order is the following: if we write

$$\langle a \rangle = \{ a^{k}\colon k \in \mathbb{Z} \}$$

for the subgroup generated by a, then

$$\operatorname{ord} (a) = \operatorname{ord}(\langle a \rangle).$$

For any integer k, we have

a^{k} = e if and only if ord(a) divides k.

In general, the order of any subgroup of G divides the order of G. More precisely: if H is a subgroup of G, then

ord(G) / ord(H) = [G : H], where [G : H] is called the index of H in G, an integer. This is Lagrange's theorem. (This is, however, only true when G has finite order. If ord(G) = ∞, the quotient ord(G) / ord(H) does not make sense.)

As an immediate consequence of the above, we see that the order of every element of a group divides the order of the group. For example, in the symmetric group shown above, where ord(S_{3}) = 6, the possible orders of the elements are 1, 2, 3 or 6.

The following partial converse is true for finite groups: if d divides the order of a group G and d is a prime number, then there exists an element of order d in G (this is sometimes called Cauchy's theorem). The statement does not hold for composite orders, e.g. the Klein four-group does not have an element of order four. This can be shown by inductive proof. The consequences of the theorem include: the order of a group G is a power of a prime p if and only if ord(a) is some power of p for every a in G.

If a has infinite order, then all non-zero powers of a have infinite order as well. If a has finite order, we have the following formula for the order of the powers of a:

ord(a^{k}) = ord(a) / gcd(ord(a), k)

for every integer k. In particular, a and its inverse a^{−1} have the same order.

In any group,

$$\operatorname{ord}(ab) = \operatorname{ord}(ba)$$

There is no general formula relating the order of a product ab to the orders of a and b. In fact, it is possible that both a and b have finite order while ab has infinite order, or that both a and b have infinite order while ab has finite order. An example of the former is a(x) = 2−x, b(x) = 1−x with ab(x) = x−1 in the group $Sym(\mathbb{Z})$. An example of the latter is a(x) = x+1, b(x) = x−1 with ab(x) = x. If ab = ba, we can at least say that ord(ab) divides lcm(ord(a), ord(b)). As a consequence, one can prove that in a finite abelian group, if m denotes the maximum of all the orders of the group's elements, then every element's order divides m.

== Counting by order of elements ==
Suppose G is a finite group of order n, and d is a divisor of n. The number of order d elements in G is a multiple of φ(d) (possibly zero), where φ is Euler's totient function, giving the number of positive integers no larger than d and coprime to it. For example, in the case of S_{3}, φ(3) = 2, and we have exactly two elements of order 3. The theorem provides no useful information about elements of order 2, because φ(2) = 1, and is only of limited utility for composite d such as d = 6, since φ(6) = 2, and there are zero elements of order 6 in S_{3}.

== In relation to homomorphisms ==
Group homomorphisms tend to reduce the orders of elements: if f: G → H is a homomorphism, and a is an element of G of finite order, then ord(f(a)) divides ord(a). If f is injective, then ord(f(a)) = ord(a). This can often be used to prove that there are no homomorphisms or no injective homomorphisms, between two explicitly given groups. (For example, there can be no nontrivial homomorphism h: S_{3} → Z_{5}, because every number except zero in Z_{5} has order 5, which does not divide the orders 1, 2, and 3 of elements in S_{3}.) A further consequence is that conjugate elements have the same order.

== Class equation ==
An important result about orders is the class equation; it relates the order of a finite group G to the order of its center Z(G) and the sizes of its non-trivial conjugacy classes:

$$|G| = |Z(G)| + \sum_{i}d_i\;$$

where the d_{i} are the sizes of the non-trivial conjugacy classes; these are proper divisors of |G| bigger than one, and they are also equal to the indices of the centralizers in G of the representatives of the non-trivial conjugacy classes. For example, the center of S_{3} is just the trivial group with the single element e, and the equation reads |S_{3}| = 1+2+3.

== See also ==
- Torsion subgroup
