= List of small groups =

The following list in mathematics contains the finite groups of small order up to group isomorphism.

== Counts ==
For n = 1, 2, … the number of nonisomorphic groups of order n is

1, 1, 1, 2, 1, 2, 1, 5, 2, 2, 1, 5, 1, 2, 1, 14, 1, 5, 1, 5, ... (sequence A000001 in the OEIS)

For labeled groups, see (sequence A034383 in the OEIS).

== Glossary ==
Each group is named by Small Groups Library as G_{o}^{i}, where o is the order of the group, and i is the index used to label the group within that order.

Common group names:

- Z_{n}: the cyclic group of order n (the notation C_{n} is also used; it is isomorphic to the additive group of Z/nZ)
- Dih_{n}: the dihedral group of order 2n (often the notation D_{n} or D_{2n} is used)
- D_{n}: the dihedral group of order 2n, the same as Dih_{n} (notation used in section List of small non-abelian groups)
- K_{4}: the Klein four-group of order 4, isomorphic to Z_{2} × Z_{2} and Dih_{2}
- S_{n}: the symmetric group of degree n, containing the n! permutations of n elements
- A_{n}: the alternating group of degree n, containing the even permutations of n elements, of order 1 for n = 0, 1, and order n!/2 otherwise
- Dic_{n} or Q_{4n}: the dicyclic group of order 4n
- Q_{8}: the quaternion group of order 8, also Dic_{2}

The notations Z_{n} and Dih_{n} have the advantage that point groups in three dimensions C_{n} and D_{n} do not have the same notation. There are more isometry groups than these two, of the same abstract group type.

The notation G × H denotes the direct product of the two groups; G^{n} denotes the direct product of a group with itself n times. G ⋊ H denotes a semidirect product where H acts on G; this may also depend on the choice of action of H on G.

Abelian and simple groups are noted. (For groups of order n < 60, the simple groups are precisely the cyclic groups Z_{n}, for prime n.)

The identity element in the cycle graphs is represented by the black circle. The lowest order for which the cycle graph does not uniquely represent a group is order 16.

In the lists of subgroups, the trivial group and the group itself are not listed. Where there are several isomorphic subgroups, the number of such subgroups is indicated in parentheses.

Angle brackets <relations> show the presentation of a group.

== List of small abelian groups ==
The finite abelian groups are either cyclic groups, or direct products thereof; see Abelian group. The numbers of nonisomorphic abelian groups of orders n = 1, 2, ... are

1, 1, 1, 2, 1, 1, 1, 3, 2, 1, 1, 2, 1, 1, 1, 5, 1, 2, 1, 2, ... (sequence A000688 in the OEIS)

For labeled abelian groups, see (sequence A034382 in the OEIS).

List of all abelian groups up to order 31
Order	Id. (Note: Identifier when groups are numbered by order, o, then by index, i, from the small groups library, starting at 1.)	G_{o}^{i}	Group	Non-trivial proper subgroups	Cycle graph	Properties
1	1	G_{1}^{1}	Z_{1} ≅ S_{1} ≅ A_{2}	–		Trivial. Cyclic. Alternating. Symmetric. Elementary.
2	2	G_{2}^{1}	Z_{2} ≅ S_{2} ≅ D_{1}	–		Simple. Symmetric. Cyclic. Elementary. (Smallest non-trivial group.)
3	3	G_{3}^{1}	Z_{3} ≅ A_{3}	–		Simple. Alternating. Cyclic. Elementary.
4	4	G_{4}^{1}	Z_{4} ≅ Q_{4}	Z_{2}		Cyclic.
4	5	G_{4}^{2}	Z_{2}^{2} ≅ K_{4} ≅ D_{2}	Z_{2} (3)		Elementary. Product. (Klein four-group. The smallest non-cyclic group.)
5	6	G_{5}^{1}	Z_{5}	–		Simple. Cyclic. Elementary.
6	8	G_{6}^{2}	Z_{6} ≅ Z_{3} × Z_{2}	Z_{3}, Z_{2}		Cyclic. Product.
7	9	G_{7}^{1}	Z_{7}	–		Simple. Cyclic. Elementary.
8	10	G_{8}^{1}	Z_{8}	Z_{4}, Z_{2}		Cyclic.
8	11	G_{8}^{2}	Z_{4} × Z_{2}	Z_{2}^{2}, Z_{4} (2), Z_{2} (3)		Product.
8	14	G_{8}^{5}	Z_{2}^{3}	Z_{2}^{2} (7), Z_{2} (7)		Product. Elementary. (The non-identity elements correspond to the points in the Fano plane, the Z_{2} × Z_{2} subgroups to the lines.)
9	15	G_{9}^{1}	Z_{9}	Z_{3}		Cyclic.
9	16	G_{9}^{2}	Z_{3}^{2}	Z_{3} (4)		Elementary. Product.
10	18	G_{10}^{2}	Z_{10} ≅ Z_{5} × Z_{2}	Z_{5}, Z_{2}		Cyclic. Product.
11	19	G_{11}^{1}	Z_{11}	–		Simple. Cyclic. Elementary.
12	21	G_{12}^{2}	Z_{12} ≅ Z_{4} × Z_{3}	Z_{6}, Z_{4}, Z_{3}, Z_{2}		Cyclic. Product.
12	24	G_{12}^{5}	Z_{6} × Z_{2} ≅ Z_{3} × Z_{2}^{2}	Z_{6} (3), Z_{3}, Z_{2} (3), Z_{2}^{2}		Product.
13	25	G_{13}^{1}	Z_{13}	–		Simple. Cyclic. Elementary.
14	27	G_{14}^{2}	Z_{14} ≅ Z_{7} × Z_{2}	Z_{7}, Z_{2}		Cyclic. Product.
15	28	G_{15}^{1}	Z_{15} ≅ Z_{5} × Z_{3}	Z_{5}, Z_{3}		Cyclic. Product.
16	29	G_{16}^{1}	Z_{16}	Z_{8}, Z_{4}, Z_{2}		Cyclic.
16	30	G_{16}^{2}	Z_{4}^{2}	Z_{2} (3), Z_{4} (6), Z_{2}^{2}, Z_{4} × Z_{2} (3)		Product.
16	33	G_{16}^{5}	Z_{8} × Z_{2}	Z_{2} (3), Z_{4} (2), Z_{2}^{2}, Z_{8} (2), Z_{4} × Z_{2}		Product.
16	38	G_{16}^{10}	Z_{4} × Z_{2}^{2}	Z_{2} (7), Z_{4} (4), Z_{2}^{2} (7), Z_{2}^{3}, Z_{4} × Z_{2} (6)		Product.
16	42	G_{16}^{14}	Z_{2}^{4} ≅ K_{4}^{2}	Z_{2} (15), Z_{2}^{2} (35), Z_{2}^{3} (15)		Product. Elementary.
17	43	G_{17}^{1}	Z_{17}	–		Simple. Cyclic. Elementary.
18	45	G_{18}^{2}	Z_{18} ≅ Z_{9} × Z_{2}	Z_{9}, Z_{6}, Z_{3}, Z_{2}		Cyclic. Product.
18	48	G_{18}^{5}	Z_{6} × Z_{3} ≅ Z_{3}^{2} × Z_{2}	Z_{2}, Z_{3} (4), Z_{6} (4), Z_{3}^{2}		Product.
19	49	G_{19}^{1}	Z_{19}	–		Simple. Cyclic. Elementary.
20	51	G_{20}^{2}	Z_{20} ≅ Z_{5} × Z_{4}	Z_{10}, Z_{5}, Z_{4}, Z_{2}		Cyclic. Product.
20	54	G_{20}^{5}	Z_{10} × Z_{2} ≅ Z_{5} × Z_{2}^{2}	Z_{2} (3), K_{4}, Z_{5}, Z_{10} (3)		Product.
21	56	G_{21}^{2}	Z_{21} ≅ Z_{7} × Z_{3}	Z_{7}, Z_{3}		Cyclic. Product.
22	58	G_{22}^{2}	Z_{22} ≅ Z_{11} × Z_{2}	Z_{11}, Z_{2}		Cyclic. Product.
23	59	G_{23}^{1}	Z_{23}	–		Simple. Cyclic. Elementary.
24	61	G_{24}^{2}	Z_{24} ≅ Z_{8} × Z_{3}	Z_{12}, Z_{8}, Z_{6}, Z_{4}, Z_{3}, Z_{2}		Cyclic. Product.
24	68	G_{24}^{9}	Z_{12} × Z_{2} ≅ Z_{6} × Z_{4} ≅ Z_{4} × Z_{3} × Z_{2}	Z_{12}, Z_{6}, Z_{4}, Z_{3}, Z_{2}		Product.
24	74	G_{24}^{15}	Z_{6} × Z_{2}^{2} ≅ Z_{3} × Z_{2}^{3}	Z_{6}, Z_{3}, Z_{2}		Product.
25	75	G_{25}^{1}	Z_{25}	Z_{5}		Cyclic.
25	76	G_{25}^{2}	Z_{5}^{2}	Z_{5} (6)		Product. Elementary.
26	78	G_{26}^{2}	Z_{26} ≅ Z_{13} × Z_{2}	Z_{13}, Z_{2}		Cyclic. Product.
27	79	G_{27}^{1}	Z_{27}	Z_{9}, Z_{3}		Cyclic.
27	80	G_{27}^{2}	Z_{9} × Z_{3}	Z_{9}, Z_{3}		Product.
27	83	G_{27}^{5}	Z_{3}^{3}	Z_{3}		Product. Elementary.
28	85	G_{28}^{2}	Z_{28} ≅ Z_{7} × Z_{4}	Z_{14}, Z_{7}, Z_{4}, Z_{2}		Cyclic. Product.
28	87	G_{28}^{4}	Z_{14} × Z_{2} ≅ Z_{7} × Z_{2}^{2}	Z_{14}, Z_{7}, Z_{4}, Z_{2}		Product.
29	88	G_{29}^{1}	Z_{29}	–		Simple. Cyclic. Elementary.
30	92	G_{30}^{4}	Z_{30} ≅ Z_{15} × Z_{2} ≅ Z_{10} × Z_{3} ≅ Z_{6} × Z_{5} ≅ Z_{5} × Z_{3} × Z_{2}	Z_{15}, Z_{10}, Z_{6}, Z_{5}, Z_{3}, Z_{2}		Cyclic. Product.
31	93	G_{31}^{1}	Z_{31}	–		Simple. Cyclic. Elementary.

== List of small non-abelian groups ==
The numbers of non-abelian groups, by order, are counted by (sequence A060689 in the OEIS). However, many orders have no non-abelian groups. The orders for which a non-abelian group exists are

6, 8, 10, 12, 14, 16, 18, 20, 21, 22, 24, 26, 27, 28, 30, 32, 34, 36, 38, 39, 40, 42, 44, 46, 48, 50, ... (sequence A060652 in the OEIS)

List of all nonabelian groups up to order 31
Order	Id.	G_{o}^{i}	Group	Non-trivial proper subgroups	Cycle graph	Properties
6	7	G_{6}^{1}	D_{3} ≅ S_{3} ≅ Z_{3} $\rtimes$ Z_{2}	Z_{3}, Z_{2} (3)		Dihedral group, Dih_{3}, the smallest non-abelian group, symmetric group, smallest Frobenius group.
8	12	G_{8}^{3}	D_{4} ≅ Z_{4} $\rtimes$ Z_{2}	Z_{4}, Z_{2}^{2} (2), Z_{2} (5)		Dihedral group, Dih_{4}. Extraspecial group. Nilpotent.
8	13	G_{8}^{4}	Q_{8} ≅ Z_{4} $.$ Z_{2}	Z_{4} (3), Z_{2}		Quaternion group, Hamiltonian group (all subgroups are normal without the group being abelian). The smallest group G demonstrating that for a normal subgroup H the quotient group G/H need not be isomorphic to a subgroup of G. Extraspecial group. Dic_{2}, Binary dihedral group <2,2,2>. Nilpotent.
10	17	G_{10}^{1}	D_{5} ≅ Z_{5} $\rtimes$ Z_{2}	Z_{5}, Z_{2} (5)		Dihedral group, Dih_{5}, Frobenius group.
12	20	G_{12}^{1}	Q_{12} ≅ Z_{3} ⋊ Z_{4}	Z_{2}, Z_{3}, Z_{4} (3), Z_{6}		Dicyclic group Dic_{3}, Binary dihedral group, <3,2,2>.
12	22	G_{12}^{3}	A_{4} ≅ K_{4} ⋊ Z_{3} ≅ (Z_{2} × Z_{2}) ⋊ Z_{3}	Z_{2}^{2}, Z_{3} (4), Z_{2} (3)		Alternating group. No subgroups of order 6, although 6 divides its order. Smallest Frobenius group that is not a dihedral group. Chiral tetrahedral symmetry (T).
12	23	G_{12}^{4}	D_{6} ≅ D_{3} × Z_{2}	Z_{6}, D_{3} (2), Z_{2}^{2} (3), Z_{3}, Z_{2} (7)		Dihedral group, Dih_{6}, product.
14	26	G_{14}^{1}	D_{7} ≅ Z_{7} $\rtimes$ Z_{2}	Z_{7}, Z_{2} (7)		Dihedral group, Dih_{7}, Frobenius group.
16	31	G_{16}^{3}	K_{4} ⋊ Z_{4}	Z_{2}^{3}, Z_{4} × Z_{2} (2), Z_{4} (4), Z_{2}^{2} (7), Z_{2} (7)		Has the same number of elements of every order as the Pauli group. Nilpotent.
16	32	G_{16}^{4}	Z_{4} ⋊ Z_{4}	Z_{4} × Z_{2} (3), Z_{4} (6), Z_{2}^{2}, Z_{2} (3)		The squares of elements do not form a subgroup. Has the same number of elements of every order as Q_{8} × Z_{2}. Nilpotent.
16	34	G_{16}^{6}	Z_{8} ⋊_{5} Z_{2}	Z_{8} (2), Z_{4} × Z_{2}, Z_{4} (2), Z_{2}^{2}, Z_{2} (3)		Sometimes called the modular group of order 16, though this is misleading as abelian groups and Q_{8} × Z_{2} are also modular. Nilpotent.
16	35	G_{16}^{7}	D_{8} ≅ Z_{8} ⋊_{−1} Z_{2}	Z_{8}, D_{4} (2), Z_{2}^{2} (4), Z_{4}, Z_{2} (9)		Dihedral group, Dih_{8}. Nilpotent.
16	36	G_{16}^{8}	QD_{16} ≅ Z_{8} ⋊_{3} Z_{2}	Z_{8}, Q_{8}, D_{4}, Z_{4} (3), Z_{2}^{2} (2), Z_{2} (5)		The order 16 quasidihedral group. Nilpotent.
16	37	G_{16}^{9}	Q_{16}	Z_{8}, Q_{8} (2), Z_{4} (5), Z_{2}		Generalized quaternion group, Dicyclic group Dic_{4}, Binary dihedral group, <4,2,2>. Nilpotent.
16	39	G_{16}^{11}	D_{4} × Z_{2}	D_{4} (4), Z_{4} × Z_{2}, Z_{2}^{3} (2), Z_{2}^{2} (13), Z_{4} (2), Z_{2} (11)		Product. Nilpotent.
16	40	G_{16}^{12}	Q_{8} × Z_{2}	Q_{8} (4), Z_{4} × Z_{2} (3), Z_{4} (6), Z_{2}^{2}, Z_{2} (3)		Hamiltonian group, product. Nilpotent.
16	41	G_{16}^{13}	(Z_{4} × Z_{2}) ⋊ Z_{2}	Q_{8}, D_{4} (3), Z_{4} × Z_{2} (3), Z_{4} (4), Z_{2}^{2} (3), Z_{2} (7)		The Pauli group generated by the Pauli matrices. Nilpotent.
18	44	G_{18}^{1}	D_{9} ≅ Z_{9} $\rtimes$ Z_{2}	Z_{9}, D_{3} (3), Z_{3}, Z_{2} (9)		Dihedral group, Dih_{9}, Frobenius group.
18	46	G_{18}^{3}	Z_{3} ⋊ Z_{6} ≅ D_{3} × Z_{3} ≅ S_{3} × Z_{3}	Z_{3}^{2}, D_{3}, Z_{6} (3), Z_{3} (4), Z_{2} (3)		Product.
18	47	G_{18}^{4}	Z_{3} $\rtimes$ S_{3}	Z_{3}^{2}, D_{3} (12), Z_{3} (4), Z_{2} (9)		Frobenius group.
20	50	G_{20}^{1}	Q_{20}	Z_{10}, Z_{5}, Z_{4} (5), Z_{2}		Dicyclic group Dic_{5}, Binary dihedral group, <5,2,2>.
20	52	G_{20}^{3}	Z_{5} ⋊ Z_{4}	D_{5}, Z_{5}, Z_{4} (5), Z_{2} (5)		Frobenius group.
20	53	G_{20}^{4}	D_{10} ≅ D_{5} × Z_{2}	Z_{10}, D_{5} (2), Z_{5}, Z_{2}^{2} (5), Z_{2} (11)		Dihedral group, Dih_{10}, product.
21	55	G_{21}^{1}	Z_{7} ⋊ Z_{3}	Z_{7}, Z_{3} (7)		Smallest non-abelian group of odd order. Frobenius group.
22	57	G_{22}^{1}	D_{11} ≅ Z_{11} $\rtimes$ Z_{2}	Z_{11}, Z_{2} (11)		Dihedral group Dih_{11}, Frobenius group.
24	60	G_{24}^{1}	Z_{3} ⋊ Z_{8}	Z_{12}, Z_{8} (3), Z_{6}, Z_{4}, Z_{3}, Z_{2}		Central extension of S_{3}.
24	62	G_{24}^{3}	SL(2,3) ≅ Q_{8} ⋊ Z_{3}	Q_{8}, Z_{6} (4), Z_{4} (3), Z_{3} (4), Z_{2}		Binary tetrahedral group, 2T = <3,3,2>.
24	63	G_{24}^{4}	Q_{24} ≅ Z_{3} ⋊ Q_{8}	Z_{12}, Q_{12} (2), Q_{8} (3), Z_{6}, Z_{4} (7), Z_{3}, Z_{2}		Dicyclic group Dic_{6}, Binary dihedral, <6,2,2>.
24	64	G_{24}^{5}	D_{3} × Z_{4} ≅ S_{3} × Z_{4}	Z_{12}, D_{6}, Q_{12}, Z_{4} × Z_{2} (3), Z_{6}, D_{3} (2), Z_{4} (4), Z_{2}^{2} (3), Z_{3}, Z_{2} (7)		Product.
24	65	G_{24}^{6}	D_{12} ≅ Z_{12} $\rtimes$ Z_{2}	Z_{12}, D_{6} (2), D_{4} (3), Z_{6}, D_{3} (4), Z_{4}, Z_{2}^{2} (6), Z_{3}, Z_{2} (13)		Dihedral group, Dih_{12}.
24	66	G_{24}^{7}	Q_{12} × Z_{2} ≅ Z_{2} × (Z_{3} ⋊ Z_{4})	Z_{6} × Z_{2}, Q_{12} (2), Z_{4} × Z_{2} (3), Z_{6} (3), Z_{4} (6), Z_{2}^{2}, Z_{3}, Z_{2} (3)		Product.
24	67	G_{24}^{8}	(Z_{6} × Z_{2}) ⋊ Z_{2} ≅ Z_{3} ⋊ D_{4}	Z_{6} × Z_{2}, D_{6}, Q_{12}, D_{4} (3), Z_{6} (3), D_{3} (2), Z_{4} (3), Z_{2}^{2} (4), Z_{3}, Z_{2} (9)		Double cover of dihedral group.
24	69	G_{24}^{10}	D_{4} × Z_{3}	Z_{12}, Z_{6} × Z_{2} (2), D_{4}, Z_{6} (5), Z_{4}, Z_{2}^{2} (2), Z_{3}, Z_{2} (5)		Product. Nilpotent.
24	70	G_{24}^{11}	Q_{8} × Z_{3}	Z_{12} (3), Q_{8}, Z_{6}, Z_{4} (3), Z_{3}, Z_{2}		Product. Nilpotent.
24	71	G_{24}^{12}	S_{4} ≅ A_{4} $\rtimes$ Z_{2}	A_{4}, D_{4} (3), D_{3} (4), Z_{4} (3), Z_{2}^{2} (4), Z_{3} (4), Z_{2} (9)		Symmetric group. Has no normal Sylow subgroups. Chiral octahedral symmetry (O), Achiral tetrahedral symmetry (T_{d}).
24	72	G_{24}^{13}	A_{4} × Z_{2}	A_{4}, Z_{2}^{3}, Z_{6} (4), Z_{2}^{2} (7), Z_{3} (4), Z_{2} (7)		Product. Pyritohedral symmetry (T_{h}).
24	73	G_{24}^{14}	D_{6} × Z_{2}	Z_{6} × Z_{2}, D_{6} (6), Z_{2}^{3} (3), Z_{6} (3), D_{3} (4), Z_{2}^{2} (19), Z_{3}, Z_{2} (15)		Product.
26	77	G_{26}^{1}	D_{13} ≅ Z_{13} $\rtimes$ Z_{2}	Z_{13}, Z_{2} (13)		Dihedral group, Dih_{13}, Frobenius group.
27	81	G_{27}^{3}	Z_{3}^{2} ⋊ Z_{3}	Z_{3}^{2} (4), Z_{3} (13)		All non-trivial elements have order 3. Extraspecial group. Nilpotent.
27	82	G_{27}^{4}	Z_{9} ⋊ Z_{3}	Z_{9} (3), Z_{3}^{2}, Z_{3} (4)		Extraspecial group. Nilpotent.
28	84	G_{28}^{1}	Z_{7} ⋊ Z_{4}	Z_{14}, Z_{7}, Z_{4} (7), Z_{2}		Dicyclic group Dic_{7}, Binary dihedral group, <7,2,2>.
28	86	G_{28}^{3}	D_{14} ≅ D_{7} × Z_{2}	Z_{14}, D_{7} (2), Z_{7}, Z_{2}^{2} (7), Z_{2} (9)		Dihedral group, Dih_{14}, product.
30	89	G_{30}^{1}	D_{3} × Z_{5}	Z_{15}, Z_{10} (3), D_{3}, Z_{5}, Z_{3}, Z_{2} (3)		Product.
30	90	G_{30}^{2}	D_{5} × Z_{3}	Z_{15}, D_{5}, Z_{6} (5), Z_{5}, Z_{3}, Z_{2} (5)		Product.
30	91	G_{30}^{3}	D_{15} ≅ Z_{15} $\rtimes$ Z_{2}	Z_{15}, D_{5} (3), D_{3} (5), Z_{5}, Z_{3}, Z_{2} (15)		Dihedral group, Dih_{15}, Frobenius group.

== Classifying groups of small order ==
Small groups of prime power order p^{n} are given as follows:

- Order p: The only group is cyclic.
- Order p^{2}: There are just two groups, both abelian.
- Order p^{3}: There are three abelian groups, and two non-abelian groups. One of the non-abelian groups is the semidirect product of a normal cyclic subgroup of order p^{2} by a cyclic group of order p. The other is the quaternion group for p = 2 and the Heisenberg group modulo p for p > 2.
- Order p^{4}: The classification is complicated, and gets much harder as the exponent of p increases.

Most groups of small order have a Sylow p subgroup P with a normal p-complement N for some prime p dividing the order, so can be classified in terms of the possible primes p, p-groups P, groups N, and actions of P on N. In some sense this reduces the classification of these groups to the classification of p-groups. Some of the small groups that do not have a normal p-complement include:

- Order 24: The symmetric group S_{4}
- Order 48: The binary octahedral group and the product S_{4} × Z_{2}
- Order 60: The alternating group A_{5}.

The smallest order for which it is not known how many nonisomorphic groups there are is 2048 = 2^{11}.

== Small Groups Library ==
The GAP computer algebra system contains a package called the "Small Groups library," which provides access to descriptions of small order groups. The groups are listed up to isomorphism. At present, the library contains the following groups:

- those of order at most 2000 except for order 1024 (423164062 groups in the library; the ones of order 1024 had to be skipped, as there are additional 49487367289 nonisomorphic 2-groups of order 1024);
- those of cubefree order at most 50000 (395 703 groups);
- those of squarefree order;
- those of order p^{n} for n at most 6 and p prime;
- those of order p^{7} for p = 3, 5, 7, 11 (907 489 groups);
- those of order pq^{n} where q^{n} divides 2^{8}, 3^{6}, 5^{5} or 7^{4} and p is an arbitrary prime which differs from q;
- those whose orders factorise into at most 3 primes (not necessarily distinct).

It contains explicit descriptions of the available groups in computer readable format.

The smallest order for which the Small Groups library does not have information is 1024.

== See also ==
- Classification of finite simple groups
- Composition series
- List of finite simple groups
- Number of groups of a given order
- Small Latin squares and quasigroups
- Sylow theorems
