= Dihedral group of order 6 =

Non-commutative group with 6 elements

In mathematics, D_{3} (sometimes alternatively denoted by D_{6}) is the dihedral group of degree 3 and order 6. It is isomorphic to the symmetric group S_{3}. It is also the smallest non-abelian group.

This page illustrates many group concepts using this group as example.

== Geometrical intuition ==
Six transformations of an equilateral triangle: three rotations and three reflections

One way to interpret the dihedral group D_{3} geometrically is by observing the symmetry of an equilateral triangle. The symmetry include the collection of all rigid transformations made by reflections, rotations, and combinations of these both. Six transformations are the results. Three reflection lines, each of which by passing through the apex opposite to the edge's midpoint of an equilateral triangle. Three rotations around the centroid of an equilateral triangle, by do-nothing transformation and the multiple of one-third of a full turn (0°, 120°, 240°)..

== Algebraic description ==
Cayley graph with permutations of a triangle

Cycle graph with permutation matrices of 3 elements (The generators a and b are the same as in the Cayley graph shown above.)

Cayley table as multiplication table of the permutation matrices

Positions of the six elements in the Cayley table Only the neutral elements are symmetric to the main diagonal, so this group is not abelian.

Cayley table as general (and special) linear group GL(2, 2)

Every possible permutation of the triangle's vertices under the dihedral group D_{3} constitutes such a transformation, so that the group of these symmetries is isomorphic to the symmetric group S_{3} of all permutations of three distinct elements. This is not the case for dihedral groups of higher orders. The dihedral group D_{3} is isomorphic to two other symmetry groups in three dimensions:

- one with a 3-fold rotation axis and a perpendicular 2-fold rotation axis (hence three of these): D_{3}
- one with a 3-fold rotation axis in a plane of reflection (and hence also in two other planes of reflection): C_{3v}

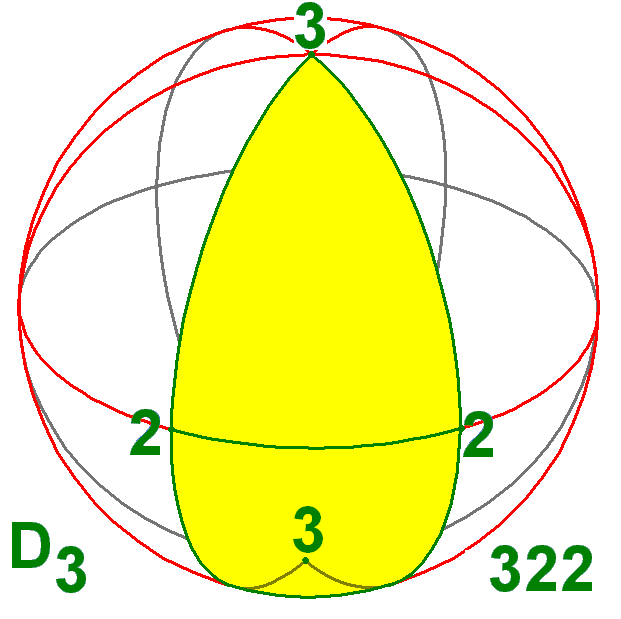

=== Permutations of a set of three objects ===
Consider three colored blocks (red, green, and blue), initially placed in the order RGB. The symmetric group S_{3} is then the group of all possible rearrangements of these blocks. If we denote by a the action "swap the first two blocks", and by b the action "swap the last two blocks", we can write all possible permutations in terms of these two actions.

In multiplicative form, we traditionally write xy for the combined action "first do y, then do x"; so that ab is the action RGB ↦ RBG ↦ BRG, i.e., "take the last block and move it to the front". If we write e for "leave the blocks as they are" (the identity action), then we can write the six permutations of the set of three blocks as the following actions:

- e : RGB ↦ RGB or ()
- a : RGB ↦ GRB or (RG)
- b : RGB ↦ RBG or (GB)
- ab : RGB ↦ GBR or (RGB)
- ba : RGB ↦ BRG or (RBG)
- aba : RGB ↦ BGR or (RB)

The notation in parentheses is the cycle notation.

Note that the action aa has the effect RGB ↦ GRB ↦ RGB, leaving the blocks as they were; so we can write aa = e. Similarly,

- bb = e,
- (aba)(aba) = e, and
- (ab)(ba) = (ba)(ab) = e;

so each of the above actions has an inverse.

By inspection, we can also determine associativity and closure (two of the necessary group axioms); note for example that

- (ab)a = a(ba) = aba, and
- (ba)b = b(ab) = bab.

The group is non-abelian since, for example, ab ≠ ba. Since it is built up from the basic actions a and b, we say that the set {a, b} generates it.

The group has presentation

$\langle r, a \mid r^3 = 1, a^2 = 1, ara = r^{-1} \rangle$, also written $\langle r, a \mid r^3, a^2, arar \rangle$

or

$\langle a, b \mid a^2 = b^2 = (ab)^3 = 1 \rangle$, also written $\langle a, b \mid a^2, b^2, (ab)^3 \rangle$

where a and b are swaps and r = ab is a cyclic permutation. Note that the second presentation means that the group is a Coxeter group. (In fact, all dihedral and symmetry groups are Coxeter groups.)

=== Summary of group operations ===
With the generators a and b, we define the additional shorthands c := aba, d := ab and f := ba, so that a, b, c, d, e, and f are all the elements of this group. We can then summarize the group operations in the form of a Cayley table:

| * | e | a | b | c | d | f |
|---|---|---|---|---|---|---|
| e | e | a | b | c | d | f |
| a | a | e | d | f | b | c |
| b | b | f | e | d | c | a |
| c | c | d | f | e | a | b |
| d | d | c | a | b | f | e |
| f | f | b | c | a | e | d |

Note that non-equal non-identity elements only commute if they are each other's inverse. Therefore, the group is centerless, i.e., the center of the group consists only of the identity element.

=== Conjugacy classes ===
We can easily distinguish three kinds of permutations of the three blocks, the conjugacy classes of the group:

- no change (), a group element of order 1
- interchanging two blocks: (RG), (RB), (GB), three group elements of order 2
- a cyclic permutation of all three blocks: (RGB), (RBG), two group elements of order 3

For example, (RG) and (RB) are both of the form (x y); a permutation of the letters R, G, and B (namely (GB)) changes the notation (RG) into (RB). Therefore, if we apply (GB), then (RB), and then the inverse of (GB), which is also (GB), the resulting permutation is (RG).

Note that conjugate group elements always have the same order, but in general two group elements that have the same order need not be conjugate.

== Subgroups ==
From Lagrange's theorem we know that any non-trivial subgroup of a group with 6 elements must have order 2 or 3. In fact the two cyclic permutations of all three blocks, with the identity, form a subgroup of order 3, index 2, and the swaps of two blocks, each with the identity, form three subgroups of order 2, index 3. The existence of subgroups of order 2 and 3 is also a consequence of Cauchy's theorem.

The first-mentioned is { (), (RGB), (RBG) }, the alternating group A_{3}.

The left cosets and the right cosets of A_{3} coincide (as they do for any subgroup of index 2) and consist of A_{3} and the set of three swaps { (RB), (RG), (BG)}.

The left cosets of { (), (RG) } are:

- { (), (RG) }
- { (RB), (RGB) }
- { (GB), (RBG) }

The right cosets of { (RG), () } are:

- { (RG), () }
- { (RBG), (RB) }
- { (RGB), (GB) }

Thus A_{3} is normal, and the other three non-trivial subgroups are not. The quotient group G / A_{3} is isomorphic with C_{2}.

$G = \mathrm{A}_3 \rtimes H$, a semidirect product, where H is a subgroup of two elements: () and one of the three swaps. This decomposition is also a consequence (particular case) of the Schur–Zassenhaus theorem.

In terms of permutations the two group elements of G / A_{3} are the set of even permutations and the set of odd permutations.

If the original group is that generated by a 120°-rotation of a plane about a point, and reflection with respect to a line through that point, then the quotient group has the two elements which can be described as the subsets "just rotate (or do nothing)" and "take a mirror image".

Note that for the symmetry group of a square, an uneven permutation of vertices does not correspond to taking a mirror image, but to operations not allowed for rectangles, i.e. 90° rotation and applying a diagonal axis of reflection.

== Semidirect products ==
$\mathrm{C}_3 \rtimes_\varphi \mathrm{C}_2$ is $\mathrm{C}_3 \times \mathrm{C}_2$ if both φ(0) and φ(1) are the identity. The semidirect product is isomorphic to the dihedral group of order 6 if φ(0) is the identity and φ(1) is the non-trivial automorphism of C_{3}, which inverses the elements.

Thus we get:

(n_{1}, 0) * (n_{2}, h_{2}) = (n_{1} + n_{2}, h_{2})
(n_{1}, 1) * (n_{2}, h_{2}) = (n_{1} − n_{2}, 1 + h_{2})

for all n_{1}, n_{2} in C_{3} and h_{2} in C_{2}. More concisely,

$$(n_1, h_1) * (n_2, h_2) = (n_1 + (-1)^{h_1} n_2, h_1 + h_2)$$

for all n_{1}, n_{2} in C_{3} and h_{1}, h_{2} in C_{2}.

In a Cayley table:

| | 00 | 10 | 20 | 01 | 11 | 21 |
|---|---|---|---|---|---|---|
| 00 | 00 | 10 | 20 | 01 | 11 | 21 |
| 10 | 10 | 20 | 00 | 11 | 21 | 01 |
| 20 | 20 | 00 | 10 | 21 | 01 | 11 |
| 01 | 01 | 21 | 11 | 00 | 20 | 10 |
| 11 | 11 | 01 | 21 | 10 | 00 | 20 |
| 21 | 21 | 11 | 01 | 20 | 10 | 00 |

Note that for the second digit we essentially have a 2×2 table, with 3×3 equal values for each of these 4 cells. For the first digit the left half of the table is the same as the right half, but the top half is different from the bottom half.

For the direct product the table is the same except that the first digits of the bottom half of the table are the same as in the top half.

== Group action ==
Consider D_{3} in the geometrical way, as a symmetry group of isometries of the plane, and consider the corresponding group action on a set of 30 evenly spaced points on a circle, numbered 0 to 29, with 0 at one of the reflexion axes.

This section illustrates group action concepts for this case.

The action of G on X is called

- transitive if for any two x, y in X there exists a g in G such that g · x = y; this is not the case
- faithful (or effective) if for any two different g, h in G there exists an x in X such that g · x ≠ h · x; this is the case, because, except for the identity, symmetry groups do not contain elements that "do nothing"
- free if for any two different g, h in G and all x in X we have g · x ≠ h · x; this is not the case because there are reflections

=== Orbits and stabilizers ===
The orbits of 30 evenly spaced points on a circle under the group action of D_{3}

The orbit of a point x in X is the set of elements of X to which x can be moved by the elements of G. The orbit of x is denoted by Gx:

$$Gx = \left\{ g\cdot x \mid g \in G \right\}$$

The orbits are {0, 10, 20}, {1, 9, 11, 19, 21, 29}, {2, 8, 12, 18, 22, 28}, {3, 7, 13, 17, 23, 27}, {4, 6, 14, 16, 24, 26}, and {5, 15, 25}. The points within an orbit are "equivalent". If a symmetry group applies for a pattern, then within each orbit the color is the same.

The set of all orbits of X under the action of G is written as X / G.

If Y is a subset of X, we write GY for the set { g · y : y ∈ Y and g ∈ G }. We call the subset Y invariant under G if GY = Y (which is equivalent to GY ⊆ Y). In that case, G also operates on Y. The subset Y is called fixed under G if g · y = y for all g in G and all y in Y. The union of e.g. two orbits is invariant under G, but not fixed.

For every x in X, we define the stabilizer subgroup of x (also called the isotropy group or little group) as the set of all elements in G that fix x:

$$G_x = \{g \in G \mid g\cdot x = x\}$$

If x is a reflection point (0, 5, 10, 15, 20, or 25), its stabilizer is the group of order two containing the identity and the reflection in x. In other cases the stabilizer is the trivial group.

For a fixed x in X, consider the map from G to X given by g ↦ g · x. The image of this map is the orbit of x and the coimage is the set of all left cosets of G_{x}. The standard quotient theorem of set theory then gives a natural bijection between G / G_{x} and Gx. Specifically, the bijection is given by hG_{x} ↦ h · x. This result is known as the orbit-stabilizer theorem. In the two cases of a small orbit, the stabilizer is non-trivial.

If two elements x and y belong to the same orbit, then their stabilizer subgroups, G_{x} and G_{y}, are isomorphic. More precisely: if y = g · x, then G_{y} = gG_{x} g^{−1}. In the example this applies e.g. for 5 and 25, both reflection points. Reflection about 25 corresponds to a rotation of 10, reflection about 5, and rotation of −10.

A result closely related to the orbit-stabilizer theorem is Burnside's lemma:

$$\left|X/G\right|=\frac{1}{\left|G\right|}\sum_{g\in G}\left|X^g\right|$$

where X^{g} is the set of points fixed by g. I.e., the number of orbits is equal to the average number of points fixed per group element.

For the identity all 30 points are fixed, for the two rotations none, and for the three reflections two each: {0, 15}, {5, 20}, and {10, 25}. Thus, the average is six, the number of orbits.

== Representation theory ==
Up to isomorphism, this group has three irreducible complex unitary representations, which we will call $I$ (the trivial representation), $\rho_1$ and $\rho_2$, where the subscript indicates the dimension. By its definition as a permutation group over the set with three elements, the group has a representation on $\mathbb{C}^3$ by permuting the entries of the vector, the fundamental representation. This representation is not irreducible, as it decomposes as a direct sum of $I$ and $\rho_2$. $I$ appears as the subspace of vectors of the form $(\lambda, \lambda, \lambda), \lambda \in \mathbb{C}$ and $\rho_2$ is the representation on its orthogonal complement, which are vectors of the form $(\lambda_1, \lambda_2, -\lambda_1 -\lambda_2)$. The nontrivial one-dimensional representation $\rho_1$ arises through the groups $\mathbb{Z}_2$ grading: The action is multiplication by the sign of the permutation of the group element. Every finite group has such a representation since it is a subgroup of a cyclic group by its regular action. Counting the square dimensions of the representations ($1^2 + 1^2 + 2^2 = 6$, the order of the group), we see these must be all of the irreducible representations.

A 2-dimensional irreducible linear representation yields a 1-dimensional projective representation (i.e., an action on the projective line, an embedding in the Möbius group PGL(2, C)), as elliptic transforms. This can be represented by matrices with entries 0 and ±1 (here written as fractional linear transformations), known as the anharmonic group:

- order 1: $z$
- order 2: $1-z, 1/z, z/(z-1)$
- order 3: $(z-1)/z, 1/(1-z)$

and thus descends to a representation over any field, which is always faithful/injective (since no two terms differ only by only a sign). Over the field with two elements, the projective line has only 3 points, and this is thus the exceptional isomorphism $S_3 \approx \mathrm{PGL}(2, 2).$ In characteristic 3, this embedding stabilizes the point $-1 = [-1:1],$ since $2 = 1/2 = -1$ (in characteristic greater than 3 these points are distinct and permuted, and are the orbit of the harmonic cross-ratio). Over the field with three elements, the projective line has 4 elements, and since PGL(2, 3) is isomorphic to the symmetric group on 4 elements, S_{4}, the resulting embedding $\mathrm{S}_3 \hookrightarrow \mathrm{S}_4$ equals the stabilizer of the point $-1$.

== See also ==
- Dihedral group of order 8
