= CFSG =

CFSG may refer to:

- The classification of finite simple groups, a mathematical theorem
- China Fire and Security Group
