= China Fire and Security Group =

Company

China Fire and Security Group, Inc.
- Company type: Public
- Traded as: Nasdaq: CSFG
- Industry: Industrial Goods
- Founded: 1995; 31 years ago
- Headquarters: Beijing, China 100027
- Area served: Asia (China), India
- Products: Fire Safety Equipment, Fire Protection Systems
- Number of employees: 425 (2010)

China Fire and Security Group, Inc. is a company that specializes in selling fire protection products.

== Overview ==
China Fire and Security Group manufactures and sells fire devices, both for protection (fire extinguishers) and warning (fire alarms). These products are geared toward iron, steel, electricity, nuclear, and petrochemical industries. They mainly serve the People's Republic of China (20 provinces) and India, and have 30 offices in that region. In addition to fire detection, prevention, and monitoring, they provide service to repair and maintain their fire systems that an institution installed.

== Products ==
China Fire and Security provides firefighting equipment to companies, including:

=== Detectors ===
- Linear heat fire detectors
- Multi-frequency infrared flame detectors
- Long range infrared combustible gas detectors
- Fixed point combustible gas detectors
- Point fire detectors

=== Alarms ===
- Fire alarm control units
- Fire control room display system,
- Fire safety monitoring center

== Subsidiaries ==
- Sureland Industrial Fire Safety Limited
