= List of finite simple groups =

In mathematics, the classification of finite simple groups states that every finite simple group is cyclic, or alternating, or in one of 16 families of groups of Lie type, or one of 26 sporadic groups.

The list below gives all finite simple groups, together with their order, the size of the Schur multiplier, the size of the outer automorphism group, usually some small representations, and lists of all duplicates.

== Summary ==
The following table is a complete list of the 18 families of finite simple groups and the 26 sporadic simple groups, along with their orders. Any non-simple members of each family are listed, as well as any members duplicated within a family or between families. (In removing duplicates it is useful to note that no two finite simple groups have the same order, except that the group A_{8} = A_{3}(2) and A_{2}(4) both have order 20160, and that the group B_{n}(q) has the same order as C_{n}(q) for q odd, n > 2. The smallest of the latter pairs of groups are B_{3}(3) and C_{3}(3) which both have order 4585351680.)

There is an unfortunate conflict between the notations for the alternating groups A_{n} and the groups of Lie type A_{n}(q). Some authors use various different fonts for A_{n} to distinguish them. In particular, in this article we make the distinction by setting the alternating groups A_{n} in Roman font and the Lie-type groups A_{n}(q) in italic.

In what follows, n is a positive integer, and q is a positive power of a prime number p, with the restrictions noted. The notation (a,b) represents the greatest common divisor of the integers a and b.

Class	Family	Order	Exclusions	Duplicates
Cyclic groups	Z_{p}	p prime	None	None
Alternating groups	A_{n} n > 4	$\frac{n!}{2}$	None	A_{5} ≃ A_{1}(4) ≃ A_{1}(5); A_{6} ≃ A_{1}(9); A_{8} ≃ A_{3}(2)
Classical Chevalley groups	A_{n}(q)	$\frac{q^{\frac{1}{2} n(n + 1)}}{(n + 1, q - 1)} \prod_{i=1}^n \left(q^{i+1} - 1\right)$	A_{1}(2), A_{1}(3)	A_{1}(4) ≃ A_{1}(5) ≃ A_{5}; A_{1}(7) ≃ A_{2}(2); A_{1}(9) ≃ A_{6}; A_{3}(2) ≃ A_{8}
Classical Chevalley groups	B_{n}(q) n > 1	$\frac{q^{n^2}}{(2, q - 1)}\prod_{i=1}^n \left(q^{2i} - 1\right)$	B_{2}(2)	B_{n}(2^{m}) ≃ C_{n}(2^{m}); B_{2}(3) ≃ ^{2}A_{3}(2^{2})
Classical Chevalley groups	C_{n}(q) n > 2	$\frac{q^{n^2}}{(2, q - 1)}\prod_{i=1}^n \left(q^{2i} - 1\right)$	None	C_{n}(2^{m}) ≃ B_{n}(2^{m})
Classical Chevalley groups	D_{n}(q) n > 3	$\frac{q^{n(n - 1)}(q^n - 1)}{(4, q^n - 1)}\prod_{i=1}^{n-1} \left(q^{2i} - 1\right)$	None	None
Exceptional Chevalley groups	E_{6}(q)	$\frac{q^{36}}{(3, q - 1)}\prod_{i\in\{2, 5, 6, 8, 9, 12\} } \left(q^i - 1\right)$	None	None
Exceptional Chevalley groups	E_{7}(q)	$\frac{q^{63}}{(2, q - 1)}\prod_{i\in\{2, 6, 8, 10, 12, 14, 18\} } \left(q^i - 1\right)$	None	None
Exceptional Chevalley groups	E_{8}(q)	$q^{120} \prod_{i\in\{2, 8, 12, 14, 18, 20, 24, 30\} } \left(q^i - 1\right)$	None	None
Exceptional Chevalley groups	F_{4}(q)	$q^{24} \prod_{i\in\{2, 6, 8, 12\} } \left(q^i - 1\right)$	None	None
Exceptional Chevalley groups	G_{2}(q)	$q^6 \prod_{i\in\{2, 6\} } \left(q^i - 1\right)$	G_{2}(2)	None
Classical Steinberg groups	^{2}A_{n}(q^{2}) n > 1	$\frac{q^{\frac{1}{2} n(n + 1)}}{(n + 1, q + 1)}\prod_{i=1}^n \left(q^{i+1} - (-1)^{i+1}\right)$	^{2}A_{2}(2^{2})	^{2}A_{3}(2^{2}) ≃ B_{2}(3)
Classical Steinberg groups	^{2}D_{n}(q^{2}) n > 3	$\frac{q^{n(n - 1)}}{(4, q^n + 1)}\left(q^n + 1\right)\prod_{i=1}^{n-1} \left(q^{2i} - 1\right)$	None	None
Exceptional Steinberg groups	^{2}E_{6}(q^{2})	$\frac{q^{36}}{(3, q + 1)}\prod_{i\in\{2, 5, 6, 8, 9, 12\} } \left(q^i - (-1)^i\right)$	None	None
Exceptional Steinberg groups	^{3}D_{4}(q^{3})	$q^{12}\left(q^8 + q^4 + 1\right)\left(q^6 - 1\right)\left(q^2 - 1\right)$	None	None
Suzuki groups	^{2}B_{2}(q) q = 2^{2n+1}	$q^2\left(q^2 + 1\right)\left(q - 1\right)$	None	None
Ree groups + Tits group	^{2}F_{4}(q) q = 2^{2n+1}	$q^{12}\left(q^6 + 1\right)\left(q^4 - 1\right)\left(q^3 + 1\right)\left(q - 1\right)$	None	None
Ree groups + Tits group	^{2}F_{4}(2)′	2^{12}(2^{6} + 1)(2^{4} − 1)(2^{3} + 1)(2 − 1)/2 = 17971200		
Ree groups + Tits group	^{2}G_{2}(q) q = 3^{2n+1}	$q^3\left(q^3 + 1\right)\left(q - 1\right)$	None	None
Mathieu groups	M_{11}	7920		
Mathieu groups	M_{12}	95040		
Mathieu groups	M_{22}	443520		
Mathieu groups	M_{23}	10200960		
Mathieu groups	M_{24}	244823040		
Janko groups	J_{1}	175560		
Janko groups	J_{2}	604800		
Janko groups	J_{3}	50232960		
Janko groups	J_{4}	86775571046077562880		
Conway groups	Co_{3}	495766656000		
Conway groups	Co_{2}	42305421312000		
Conway groups	Co_{1}	4157776806543360000		
Fischer groups	Fi_{22}	64561751654400		
Fischer groups	Fi_{23}	4089470473293004800		
Fischer groups	Fi_{24}′	1255205709190661721292800		
Higman–Sims group	HS	44352000		
McLaughlin group	McL	898128000		
Held group	He	4030387200		
Rudvalis group	Ru	145926144000		
Suzuki sporadic group	Suz	448345497600		
O'Nan group	O'N	460815505920		
Harada–Norton group	HN	273030912000000		
Lyons group	Ly	51765179004000000		
Thompson group	Th	90745943887872000		
Baby Monster group	B	4154781481226426191177580544000000		
Monster group	M	808017424794512875886459904961710757005754368000000000		

== Cyclic groups, Z_{p} ==
Simplicity: Simple for p a prime number.

Order: p

Schur multiplier: Trivial.

Outer automorphism group: Cyclic of order p − 1.

Other names: Z/pZ, C_{p}

Remarks: These are the only simple groups that are not perfect.

== Alternating groups, A_{n}, n = 3, n > 4 ==
Simplicity: Solvable for n ≤ 2 and n = 4, otherwise simple.

Order: n!/2 when n > 1.

Schur multiplier: 2 for n = 5 or n > 7, 6 for n = 6 or 7; see Covering groups of the alternating and symmetric groups

Outer automorphism group: In general 2. Exceptions: for n = 1, n = 2, it is trivial, and for n = 6, it has order 4 (elementary abelian).

Other names: Alt_{n}.

Isomorphisms: A_{1} and A_{2} are trivial. A_{3} is cyclic of order 3. A_{4} is isomorphic to A_{1}(3) (solvable). A_{5} is isomorphic to A_{1}(4) and to A_{1}(5). A_{6} is isomorphic to A_{1}(9) and to the derived group B_{2}(2)′. A_{8} is isomorphic to A_{3}(2).

Remarks: An index 2 subgroup of the symmetric group of permutations of n points when n > 1.

== Groups of Lie type ==
Notation: n is a positive integer, q > 1 is a power of a prime number p, and is the order of some underlying finite field. The order of the outer automorphism group is written as d⋅f⋅g, where d is the order of the group of "diagonal automorphisms", f is the order of the (cyclic) group of "field automorphisms" (generated by a Frobenius automorphism), and g is the order of the group of "graph automorphisms" (coming from automorphisms of the Dynkin diagram). The outer automorphism group is often, but not always, isomorphic to the semidirect product $D \rtimes (F \times G)$ where all these groups $D, F, G$ are cyclic of the respective orders d, f, g, except for type $D_n(q)$, $q$ odd, where the group of order $d=4$ is $C_2 \times C_2$, and (only when $n=4$) $G = S_3$, the symmetric group on three elements. The notation (a,b) represents the greatest common divisor of the integers a and b.

=== Chevalley groups, A_{n}(q), B_{n}(q) n > 1, C_{n}(q) n > 2, D_{n}(q) n > 3 ===
	Chevalley groups, A_{n}(q) linear groups	Chevalley groups, B_{n}(q) n > 1 orthogonal groups	Chevalley groups, C_{n}(q) n > 2 symplectic groups	Chevalley groups, D_{n}(q) n > 3 orthogonal groups
Simplicity	A_{1}(2) and A_{1}(3) are solvable, the others are simple.	B_{2}(2) is not simple but its derived group B_{2}(2)′ is a simple subgroup of index 2; the others are simple.	All simple	All simple
Order	$\frac{q^{\frac{1}{2} n(n + 1)}}{(n + 1, q - 1)} \prod_{i=1}^n\left(q^{i+1} - 1\right)$	$\frac{q^{n^2}}{(2, q - 1)} \prod_{i=1}^n\left(q^{2i} - 1\right)$	$\frac{q^{n^2}}{(2, q - 1)} \prod_{i=1}^n\left(q^{2i} - 1\right)$	$\frac{q^{n(n-1)}(q^n - 1)}{(4, q^n-1)} \prod_{i=1}^{n-1}\left(q^{2i} - 1\right)$
Schur multiplier	For the simple groups it is cyclic of order (n+1,q−1) except for A_{1}(4) (order 2), A_{1}(9) (order 6), A_{2}(2) (order 2), A_{2}(4) (order 48, product of cyclic groups of orders 3, 4, 4), A_{3}(2) (order 2).	(2,q−1) except for B_{2}(2) = S_{6} (order 2 for B_{2}(2), order 6 for B_{2}(2)′) and B_{3}(2) (order 2) and B_{3}(3) (order 6).	(2,q−1) except for C_{3}(2) (order 2).	The order is (4,q^{n}−1) (cyclic for n odd, elementary abelian for n even) except for D_{4}(2) (order 4, elementary abelian).
Outer automorphism group	(2,q−1)⋅f⋅1 for n = 1; (n+1,q−1)⋅f⋅2 for n > 1, where q = p^{f}	(2,q−1)⋅f⋅1 for q odd or n > 2; (2,q−1)⋅f⋅2 for q even and n = 2, where q = p^{f}	(2,q−1)⋅f⋅1, where q = p^{f}	(2,q−1)^{2}⋅f⋅S_{3} for n = 4, (2,q−1)^{2}⋅f⋅2 for n > 4 even, (4,q^{n}−1)⋅f⋅2 for n odd, where q = p^{f}, and S_{3} is the symmetric group of order 3! on 3 points.
Other names	Projective special linear groups, PSL_{n+1}(q), L_{n+1}(q), PSL(n + 1,q)	O_{2n+1}(q), Ω_{2n+1}(q) (for q odd).	Projective symplectic group, PSp_{2n}(q), PSp_{n}(q) (not recommended), S_{2n}(q), Abelian group (archaic).	O_{2n}^{+}(q), PΩ_{2n}^{+}(q). "Hypoabelian group" is an archaic name for this group in characteristic 2.
Isomorphisms	A_{1}(2) is isomorphic to the symmetric group on 3 points of order 6. A_{1}(3) is isomorphic to the alternating group A_{4} (solvable). A_{1}(4) and A_{1}(5) are both isomorphic to the alternating group A_{5}. A_{1}(7) and A_{2}(2) are isomorphic. A_{1}(8) is isomorphic to the derived group ^{2}G_{2}(3)′. A_{1}(9) is isomorphic to A_{6} and to the derived group B_{2}(2)′. A_{3}(2) is isomorphic to A_{8}.	B_{n}(2^{m}) is isomorphic to C_{n}(2^{m}). B_{2}(2) is isomorphic to the symmetric group on 6 points, and the derived group B_{2}(2)′ is isomorphic to A_{1}(9) and to A_{6}. B_{2}(3) is isomorphic to ^{2}A_{3}(2^{2}).	C_{n}(2^{m}) is isomorphic to B_{n}(2^{m})	
Remarks	These groups are obtained from the general linear groups GL_{n+1}(q) by taking the elements of determinant 1 (giving the special linear groups SL_{n+1}(q)) and then quotienting out by the center.	This is the group obtained from the orthogonal group in dimension 2n + 1 by taking the kernel of the determinant and spinor norm maps. B_{1}(q) also exists, but is the same as A_{1}(q). B_{2}(q) has a non-trivial graph automorphism when q is a power of 2.	This group is obtained from the symplectic group in 2n dimensions by quotienting out the center. C_{1}(q) also exists, but is the same as A_{1}(q). C_{2}(q) also exists, but is the same as B_{2}(q).	This is the group obtained from the split orthogonal group in dimension 2n by taking the kernel of the determinant (or Dickson invariant in characteristic 2) and spinor norm maps and then killing the center. The groups of type D_{4} have an unusually large diagram automorphism group of order 6, containing the triality automorphism. D_{2}(q) also exists, but is the same as A_{1}(q)×A_{1}(q). D_{3}(q) also exists, but is the same as A_{3}(q).

=== Chevalley groups, E_{6}(q), E_{7}(q), E_{8}(q), F_{4}(q), G_{2}(q) ===
	Chevalley groups, E_{6}(q)	Chevalley groups, E_{7}(q)	Chevalley groups, E_{8}(q)	Chevalley groups, F_{4}(q)	Chevalley groups, G_{2}(q)
Simplicity	All simple	All simple	All simple	All simple	G_{2}(2) is not simple but its derived group G_{2}(2)′ is a simple subgroup of index 2; the others are simple.
Order	q^{36}(q^{12}−1)(q^{9}−1)(q^{8}−1)(q^{6}−1)(q^{5}−1)(q^{2}−1)/(3,q−1)	q^{63}(q^{18}−1)(q^{14}−1)(q^{12}−1)(q^{10}−1)(q^{8}−1)(q^{6}−1)(q^{2}−1)/(2,q−1)	q^{120}(q^{30}−1)(q^{24}−1)(q^{20}−1)(q^{18}−1)(q^{14}−1)(q^{12}−1)(q^{8}−1)(q^{2}−1)	q^{24}(q^{12}−1)(q^{8}−1)(q^{6}−1)(q^{2}−1)	q^{6}(q^{6}−1)(q^{2}−1)
Schur multiplier	(3,q−1)	(2,q−1)	Trivial	Trivial except for F_{4}(2) (order 2)	Trivial for the simple groups except for G_{2}(3) (order 3) and G_{2}(4) (order 2)
Outer automorphism group	(3,q−1)⋅f⋅2, where q = p^{f}	(2,q−1)⋅f⋅1, where q = p^{f}	1⋅f⋅1, where q = p^{f}	1⋅f⋅1 for q odd, 1⋅f⋅2 for q even, where q = p^{f}	1⋅f⋅1 for q not a power of 3, 1⋅f⋅2 for q a power of 3, where q = p^{f}
Other names	Exceptional Chevalley group	Exceptional Chevalley group	Exceptional Chevalley group	Exceptional Chevalley group	Exceptional Chevalley group
Isomorphisms					The derived group G_{2}(2)′ is isomorphic to ^{2}A_{2}(3^{2}).
Remarks	Has two representations of dimension 27, and acts on the Lie algebra of dimension 78.	Has a representations of dimension 56, and acts on the corresponding Lie algebra of dimension 133.	It acts on the corresponding Lie algebra of dimension 248. E_{8}(3) contains the Thompson simple group.	These groups act on 27-dimensional exceptional Jordan algebras, which gives them 26-dimensional representations. They also act on the corresponding Lie algebras of dimension 52. F_{4}(q) has a non-trivial graph automorphism when q is a power of 2.	These groups are the automorphism groups of 8-dimensional Cayley algebras over finite fields, which gives them 7-dimensional representations. They also act on the corresponding Lie algebras of dimension 14. G_{2}(q) has a non-trivial graph automorphism when q is a power of 3. Moreover, they appear as automorphism groups of certain point-line geometries called split Cayley generalized hexagons.

=== Steinberg groups, ^{2}A_{n}(q^{2}) n > 1, ^{2}D_{n}(q^{2}) n > 3, ^{2}E_{6}(q^{2}), ^{3}D_{4}(q^{3}) ===
	Steinberg groups, ^{2}A_{n}(q^{2}) n > 1 unitary groups	Steinberg groups, ^{2}D_{n}(q^{2}) n > 3 orthogonal groups	Steinberg groups, ^{2}E_{6}(q^{2})	Steinberg groups, ^{3}D_{4}(q^{3})
Simplicity	^{2}A_{2}(2^{2}) is solvable, the others are simple.	All simple	All simple	All simple
Order	${1 \over (n + 1, q + 1)}q^{\frac{1}{2}n(n + 1)} \prod_{i=1}^n\left(q^{i+1} - (-1)^{i+1}\right)$	${1 \over (4, q^n + 1)}q^{n(n - 1)}(q^n + 1) \prod_{i=1}^{n - 1}\left(q^{2i} - 1\right)$	q^{36}(q^{12}−1)(q^{9}+1)(q^{8}−1)(q^{6}−1)(q^{5}+1)(q^{2}−1)/(3,q+1)	q^{12}(q^{8}+q^{4}+1)(q^{6}−1)(q^{2}−1)
Schur multiplier	Cyclic of order (n+1,q+1) for the simple groups, except for ^{2}A_{3}(2^{2}) (order 2), ^{2}A_{3}(3^{2}) (order 36, product of cyclic groups of orders 3,3,4), ^{2}A_{5}(2^{2}) (order 12, product of cyclic groups of orders 2,2,3)	Cyclic of order (4,q^{n}+1)	(3,q+1) except for ^{2}E_{6}(2^{2}) (order 12, product of cyclic groups of orders 2,2,3).	Trivial
Outer automorphism group	(n+1,q+1)⋅f⋅1, where q^{2} = p^{f}	(4,q^{n}+1)⋅f⋅1, where q^{2} = p^{f}	(3,q+1)⋅f⋅1, where q^{2} = p^{f}	1⋅f⋅1, where q^{3} = p^{f}
Other names	Twisted Chevalley group, projective special unitary group, PSU_{n+1}(q), PSU(n + 1, q), U_{n+1}(q), ^{2}A_{n}(q), ^{2}A_{n}(q, q^{2})	^{2}D_{n}(q), O_{2n}^{−}(q), PΩ_{2n}^{−}(q), twisted Chevalley group. "Hypoabelian group" is an archaic name for this group in characteristic 2.	^{2}E_{6}(q), twisted Chevalley group	^{3}D_{4}(q), D_{4}^{2}(q^{3}), Twisted Chevalley groups
Isomorphisms	The solvable group ^{2}A_{2}(2^{2}) is isomorphic to an extension of the order 8 quaternion group by an elementary abelian group of order 9. ^{2}A_{2}(3^{2}) is isomorphic to the derived group G_{2}(2)′. ^{2}A_{3}(2^{2}) is isomorphic to B_{2}(3).			
Remarks	This is obtained from the unitary group in n + 1 dimensions by taking the subgroup of elements of determinant 1 and then quotienting out by the center.	This is the group obtained from the non-split orthogonal group in dimension 2n by taking the kernel of the determinant (or Dickson invariant in characteristic 2) and spinor norm maps and then killing the center. ^{2}D_{2}(q^{2}) also exists, but is the same as A_{1}(q^{2}). ^{2}D_{3}(q^{2}) also exists, but is the same as ^{2}A_{3}(q^{2}).	One of the exceptional double covers of ^{2}E_{6}(2^{2}) is a subgroup of the baby monster group, and the exceptional central extension by the elementary abelian group of order 4 is a subgroup of the monster group.	^{3}D_{4}(2^{3}) acts on the unique even 26-dimensional lattice of determinant 3 with no roots.

=== Suzuki groups, ^{2}B_{2}(2^{2n+1}) ===
Simplicity: Simple for n ≥ 1. The group ^{2}B_{2}(2) is solvable.

Order: q^{2} (q^{2} + 1) (q − 1), where q = 2^{2n+1}.

Schur multiplier: Trivial for n ≠ 1, elementary abelian of order 4 for ^{2}B_{2}(8).

Outer automorphism group:

1⋅f⋅1,

where f = 2n + 1.

Other names: Suz(2^{2n+1}), Sz(2^{2n+1}).

Isomorphisms: ^{2}B_{2}(2) is the Frobenius group of order 20.

Remarks: Suzuki group are Zassenhaus groups acting on sets of size (2^{2n+1})^{2} + 1, and have 4-dimensional representations over the field with 2^{2n+1} elements. They are the only non-cyclic simple groups whose order is not divisible by 3. They are not related to the sporadic Suzuki group.

=== Ree groups and Tits group, ^{2}F_{4}(2^{2n+1}) ===
Simplicity: Simple for n ≥ 1. The derived group ^{2}F_{4}(2)′ is simple of index 2 in ^{2}F_{4}(2), and is called the Tits group, named for the Belgian mathematician Jacques Tits.

Order: q^{12} (q^{6} + 1) (q^{4} − 1) (q^{3} + 1) (q − 1), where q = 2^{2n+1}.

The Tits group has order 17971200 = 2^{11} ⋅ 3^{3} ⋅ 5^{2} ⋅ 13.

Schur multiplier: Trivial for n ≥ 1 and for the Tits group.

Outer automorphism group:

1⋅f⋅1,

where f = 2n + 1. Order 2 for the Tits group.

Remarks: Unlike the other simple groups of Lie type, the Tits group does not have a BN pair, though its automorphism group does, so most authors classify it as an "honorary" group of Lie type.

=== Ree groups, ^{2}G_{2}(3^{2n+1}) ===
Simplicity: Simple for n ≥ 1. The group ^{2}G_{2}(3) is not simple, but its derived group ^{2}G_{2}(3)′ is a simple subgroup of index 3.

Order: q^{3} (q^{3} + 1) (q − 1), where q = 3^{2n+1}

Schur multiplier: Trivial for n ≥ 1 and for ^{2}G_{2}(3)′.

Outer automorphism group:

1⋅f⋅1,

where f = 2n + 1.

Other names: Ree(3^{2n+1}), R(3^{2n+1}), E_{2}^{∗}(3^{2n+1}).

Isomorphisms: The derived group ^{2}G_{2}(3)′ is isomorphic to A_{1}(8).

Remarks: ^{2}G_{2}(3^{2n+1}) has a doubly transitive permutation representation on 3^{3(2n+1)} + 1 points and acts on a 7-dimensional vector space over the field with 3^{2n+1} elements.

== Sporadic groups ==
=== Mathieu groups, M_{11}, M_{12}, M_{22}, M_{23}, M_{24} ===
	Mathieu group, M_{11}	Mathieu group, M_{12}	Mathieu group, M_{22}	Mathieu group, M_{23}	Mathieu group, M_{24}
Order	2^{4} ⋅ 3^{2} ⋅ 5 ⋅ 11 = 7920	2^{6} ⋅ 3^{3} ⋅ 5 ⋅ 11 = 95040	2^{7} ⋅ 3^{2} ⋅ 5 ⋅ 7 ⋅ 11 = 443520	2^{7} ⋅ 3^{2} ⋅ 5 ⋅ 7 ⋅ 11 ⋅ 23 = 10200960	2^{10} ⋅ 3^{3} ⋅ 5 ⋅ 7 ⋅ 11 ⋅ 23 = 244823040
Schur multiplier	Trivial	Order 2	Cyclic of order 12 (Note: There were several mistakes made in the initial calculations of the Schur multiplier, so some older books and papers list incorrect values. (This caused an error in the title of Janko's original 1976 paper giving evidence for the existence of the group J_{4}. At the time it was thought that the full covering group of M_{22} was 6⋅M_{22}. In fact J_{4} has no subgroup 12⋅M_{22}.))	Trivial	Trivial
Outer automorphism group	Trivial	Order 2	Order 2	Trivial	Trivial
Remarks	A 4-transitive permutation group on 11 points, and is the point stabilizer of M_{12} (in the 5-transitive 12-point permutation representation of M_{12}). The group M_{11} is also contained in M_{23}. The subgroup of M_{11} fixing a point in the 4-transitive 11-point permutation representation is sometimes called M_{10}, and has a subgroup of index 2 isomorphic to the alternating group A_{6}.	A 5-transitive permutation group on 12 points, contained in M_{24}.	A 3-transitive permutation group on 22 points, and is the point stabilizer of M_{23} (in the 4-transitive 23-point permutation representation of M_{23}). The subgroup of M_{22} fixing a point in the 3-transitive 22-point permutation representation is sometimes called M_{21}, and is isomorphic to PSL(3,4) (i.e. isomorphic to A_{2}(4)).	A 4-transitive permutation group on 23 points, and is the point stabilizer of M_{24} (in the 5-transitive 24-point permutation representation of M_{24}).	A 5-transitive permutation group on 24 points.

=== Janko groups, J_{1}, J_{2}, J_{3}, J_{4} ===
	Janko group, J_{1}	Janko group, J_{2}	Janko group, J_{3}	Janko group, J_{4}
Order	2^{3} ⋅ 3 ⋅ 5 ⋅ 7 ⋅ 11 ⋅ 19 = 175560	2^{7} ⋅ 3^{3} ⋅ 5^{2} ⋅ 7 = 604800	2^{7} ⋅ 3^{5} ⋅ 5 ⋅ 17 ⋅ 19 = 50232960	2^{21} ⋅ 3^{3} ⋅ 5 ⋅ 7 ⋅ 11^{3} ⋅ 23 ⋅ 29 ⋅ 31 ⋅ 37 ⋅ 43 = 86775571046077562880
Schur multiplier	Trivial	Order 2	Order 3	Trivial
Outer automorphism group	Trivial	Order 2	Order 2	Trivial
Other names	J(1), J(11)	Hall–Janko group, HJ	Higman–Janko–McKay group, HJM	
Remarks	It is a subgroup of G_{2}(11), and so has a 7-dimensional representation over the field with 11 elements.	The automorphism group J_{2}:2 of J_{2} is the automorphism group of a rank 3 graph on 100 points called the Hall-Janko graph. It is also the automorphism group of a regular near octagon called the Hall-Janko near octagon. The group J_{2} is contained in G_{2}(4).	J_{3} seems unrelated to any other sporadic groups (or to anything else). Its triple cover has a 9-dimensional unitary representation over the field with 4 elements.	Has a 112-dimensional representation over the field with 2 elements.

=== Conway groups, Co_{1}, Co_{2}, Co_{3} ===
	Conway group, Co_{1}	Conway group, Co_{2}	Conway group, Co_{3}
Order	2^{21} ⋅ 3^{9} ⋅ 5^{4} ⋅ 7^{2} ⋅ 11 ⋅ 13 ⋅ 23 = 4157776806543360000	2^{18} ⋅ 3^{6} ⋅ 5^{3} ⋅ 7 ⋅ 11 ⋅ 23 = 42305421312000	2^{10} ⋅ 3^{7} ⋅ 5^{3} ⋅ 7 ⋅ 11 ⋅ 23 = 495766656000
Schur multiplier	Order 2	Trivial	Trivial
Outer automorphism group	Trivial	Trivial	Trivial
Other names	·1	·2	·3, C_{3}
Remarks	The perfect double cover Co_{0} of Co_{1} is the automorphism group of the Leech lattice, and is sometimes denoted by ·0.	Subgroup of Co_{0}; fixes a norm 4 vector in the Leech lattice.	Subgroup of Co_{0}; fixes a norm 6 vector in the Leech lattice. It has a doubly transitive permutation representation on 276 points.

=== Fischer groups, Fi_{22}, Fi_{23}, Fi_{24}′ ===
	Fischer group, Fi_{22}	Fischer group, Fi_{23}	Fischer group, Fi_{24}′
Order	2^{17} ⋅ 3^{9} ⋅ 5^{2} ⋅ 7 ⋅ 11 ⋅ 13 = 64561751654400	2^{18} ⋅ 3^{13} ⋅ 5^{2} ⋅ 7 ⋅ 11 ⋅ 13 ⋅ 17 ⋅ 23 = 4089470473293004800	2^{21} ⋅ 3^{16} ⋅ 5^{2} ⋅ 7^{3} ⋅ 11 ⋅ 13 ⋅ 17 ⋅ 23 ⋅ 29 = 1255205709190661721292800
Schur multiplier	Order 6	Trivial	Order 3
Outer automorphism group	Order 2	Trivial	Order 2
Other names	M(22)	M(23)	M(24)′, F_{3+}
Remarks	A 3-transposition group whose double cover is contained in Fi_{23}.	A 3-transposition group contained in Fi_{24}′.	The triple cover is contained in the monster group.

=== Higman–Sims group, HS ===
Order: 2^{9} ⋅ 3^{2} ⋅ 5^{3} ⋅ 7 ⋅ 11 = 44352000

Schur multiplier: Order 2.

Outer automorphism group: Order 2.

Remarks: It acts as a rank 3 permutation group on the Higman Sims graph with 100 points, and is contained in Co_{2} and in Co_{3}.

=== McLaughlin group, McL ===
Order: 2^{7} ⋅ 3^{6} ⋅ 5^{3} ⋅ 7 ⋅ 11 = 898128000

Schur multiplier: Order 3.

Outer automorphism group: Order 2.

Remarks: Acts as a rank 3 permutation group on the McLaughlin graph with 275 points, and is contained in Co_{2} and in Co_{3}.

=== Held group, He ===
Order: 2^{10} ⋅ 3^{3} ⋅ 5^{2} ⋅ 7^{3} ⋅ 17 = 4030387200

Schur multiplier: Trivial.

Outer automorphism group: Order 2.

Other names: Held–Higman–McKay group, HHM, F_{7}, HTH

Remarks: Centralizes an element of order 7 in the monster group.

=== Rudvalis group, Ru ===
Order: 2^{14} ⋅ 3^{3} ⋅ 5^{3} ⋅ 7 ⋅ 13 ⋅ 29 = 145926144000

Schur multiplier: Order 2.

Outer automorphism group: Trivial.

Remarks: The double cover acts on a 28-dimensional lattice over the Gaussian integers.

=== Suzuki sporadic group, Suz ===
Order: 2^{13} ⋅ 3^{7} ⋅ 5^{2} ⋅ 7 ⋅ 11 ⋅ 13 = 448345497600

Schur multiplier: Order 6.

Outer automorphism group: Order 2.

Other names: Sz

Remarks: The 6 fold cover acts on a 12-dimensional lattice over the Eisenstein integers. It is not related to the Suzuki groups of Lie type.

=== O'Nan group, O'N ===
Order: 2^{9} ⋅ 3^{4} ⋅ 5 ⋅ 7^{3} ⋅ 11 ⋅ 19 ⋅ 31 = 460815505920

Schur multiplier: Order 3.

Outer automorphism group: Order 2.

Other names: O'Nan–Sims group, O'NS, O–S

Remarks: The triple cover has two 45-dimensional representations over the field with 7 elements, exchanged by an outer automorphism.

=== Harada–Norton group, HN ===
Order: 2^{14} ⋅ 3^{6} ⋅ 5^{6} ⋅ 7 ⋅ 11 ⋅ 19 = 273030912000000

Schur multiplier: Trivial.

Outer automorphism group: Order 2.

Other names: F_{5}, D

Remarks: Centralizes an element of order 5 in the monster group.

=== Lyons group, Ly ===
Order: 2^{8} ⋅ 3^{7} ⋅ 5^{6} ⋅ 7 ⋅ 11 ⋅ 31 ⋅ 37 ⋅ 67 = 51765179004000000

Schur multiplier: Trivial.

Outer automorphism group: Trivial.

Other names: Lyons–Sims group, LyS

Remarks: Has a 111-dimensional representation over the field with 5 elements.

=== Thompson group, Th ===
Order: 2^{15} ⋅ 3^{10} ⋅ 5^{3} ⋅ 7^{2} ⋅ 13 ⋅ 19 ⋅ 31 = 90745943887872000

Schur multiplier: Trivial.

Outer automorphism group: Trivial.

Other names: F_{3}, E

Remarks: Centralizes an element of order 3 in the monster. Has a 248-dimensional representation which, when reduced modulo 3, leads to containment in E_{8}(3).

=== Baby Monster group, B ===
Order:

2^{41} ⋅ 3^{13} ⋅ 5^{6} ⋅ 7^{2} ⋅ 11 ⋅ 13 ⋅ 17 ⋅ 19 ⋅ 23 ⋅ 31 ⋅ 47
= 4154781481226426191177580544000000

Schur multiplier: Order 2.

Outer automorphism group: Trivial.

Other names: F_{2}

Remarks: The double cover is contained in the monster group. It has a representation of dimension 4371 over the complex numbers (with no nontrivial invariant product), and a representation of dimension 4370 over the field with 2 elements preserving a commutative but non-associative product.

=== Fischer–Griess Monster group, M ===
Order:

2^{46} ⋅ 3^{20} ⋅ 5^{9} ⋅ 7^{6} ⋅ 11^{2} ⋅ 13^{3} ⋅ 17 ⋅ 19 ⋅ 23 ⋅ 29 ⋅ 31 ⋅ 41 ⋅ 47 ⋅ 59 ⋅ 71
= 808017424794512875886459904961710757005754368000000000

Schur multiplier: Trivial.

Outer automorphism group: Trivial.

Other names: F_{1}, M_{1}, Monster group, Friendly giant, Fischer's monster.

Remarks: Contains all but 6 of the other sporadic groups as subquotients. Related to monstrous moonshine. The monster is the automorphism group of the 196,883-dimensional Griess algebra and the infinite-dimensional monster vertex operator algebra, and acts naturally on the monster Lie algebra.

== Non-cyclic simple groups of small order ==
Order	Factored order	Group	Schur multiplier	Outer automorphism group
60	2^{2} ⋅ 3 ⋅ 5	A_{5} ≃ A_{1}(4) ≃ A_{1}(5)	2	2
168	2^{3} ⋅ 3 ⋅ 7	A_{1}(7) ≃ A_{2}(2)	2	2
360	2^{3} ⋅ 3^{2} ⋅ 5	A_{6} ≃ A_{1}(9) ≃ B_{2}(2)′	6	2×2
504	2^{3} ⋅ 3^{2} ⋅ 7	A_{1}(8) ≃ ^{2}G_{2}(3)′	1	3
660	2^{2} ⋅ 3 ⋅ 5 ⋅ 11	A_{1}(11)	2	2
1092	2^{2} ⋅ 3 ⋅ 7 ⋅ 13	A_{1}(13)	2	2
2448	2^{4} ⋅ 3^{2} ⋅ 17	A_{1}(17)	2	2
2520	2^{3} ⋅ 3^{2} ⋅ 5 ⋅ 7	A_{7}	6	2
3420	2^{2} ⋅ 3^{2} ⋅ 5 ⋅ 19	A_{1}(19)	2	2
4080	2^{4} ⋅ 3 ⋅ 5 ⋅ 17	A_{1}(16)	1	4
5616	2^{4} ⋅ 3^{3} ⋅ 13	A_{2}(3)	1	2
6048	2^{5} ⋅ 3^{3} ⋅ 7	^{2}A_{2}(9) ≃ G_{2}(2)′	1	2
6072	2^{3} ⋅ 3 ⋅ 11 ⋅ 23	A_{1}(23)	2	2
7800	2^{3} ⋅ 3 ⋅ 5^{2} ⋅ 13	A_{1}(25)	2	2×2
7920	2^{4} ⋅ 3^{2} ⋅ 5 ⋅ 11	M_{11}	1	1
9828	2^{2} ⋅ 3^{3} ⋅ 7 ⋅ 13	A_{1}(27)	2	6
12180	2^{2} ⋅ 3 ⋅ 5 ⋅ 7 ⋅ 29	A_{1}(29)	2	2
14880	2^{5} ⋅ 3 ⋅ 5 ⋅ 31	A_{1}(31)	2	2
20160	2^{6} ⋅ 3^{2} ⋅ 5 ⋅ 7	A_{3}(2) ≃ A_{8}	2	2
20160	2^{6} ⋅ 3^{2} ⋅ 5 ⋅ 7	A_{2}(4)	3×4^{2}	D_{12}
25308	2^{2} ⋅ 3^{2} ⋅ 19 ⋅ 37	A_{1}(37)	2	2
25920	2^{6} ⋅ 3^{4} ⋅ 5	^{2}A_{3}(4) ≃ B_{2}(3)	2	2
29120	2^{6} ⋅ 5 ⋅ 7 ⋅ 13	^{2}B_{2}(8)	2^{2}	3
32736	2^{5} ⋅ 3 ⋅ 11 ⋅ 31	A_{1}(32)	1	5
34440	2^{3} ⋅ 3 ⋅ 5 ⋅ 7 ⋅ 41	A_{1}(41)	2	2
39732	2^{2} ⋅ 3 ⋅ 7 ⋅ 11 ⋅ 43	A_{1}(43)	2	2
51888	2^{4} ⋅ 3 ⋅ 23 ⋅ 47	A_{1}(47)	2	2
58800	2^{4} ⋅ 3 ⋅ 5^{2} ⋅ 7^{2}	A_{1}(49)	2	2^{2}
62400	2^{6} ⋅ 3 ⋅ 5^{2} ⋅ 13	^{2}A_{2}(16)	1	4
74412	2^{2} ⋅ 3^{3} ⋅ 13 ⋅ 53	A_{1}(53)	2	2
95040	2^{6} ⋅ 3^{3} ⋅ 5 ⋅ 11	M_{12}	2	2

(Complete for orders less than 100,000)

Hall (1972) lists the 56 non-cyclic simple groups of order less than a million.

== See also ==
- List of small groups
