= Janko (disambiguation) =

Janko is a surname and given name.

Janko may also refer to:

- Janko group, in mathematics
  - Janko group J1
  - Janko group J2
  - Janko group J3
  - Janko group J4
- Jankó keyboard
- Jankwa (or Janko), a Newar ritual

== See also ==
- Janko Kráľ Park, a park in Bratislava's Petržalka borough
