= Janko group =

In the area of modern algebra known as group theory, the Janko groups are the four sporadic simple groups J_{1}, J_{2}, J_{3} and J_{4} introduced by Zvonimir Janko. Unlike the Mathieu groups, Conway groups, or Fischer groups, the Janko groups do not form a series, and the relation among the four groups is mainly historical rather than mathematical.

== History ==
Janko constructed the first of these groups, J_{1}, in 1965 and predicted the existence of J_{2} and J_{3}. In 1976, he suggested the existence of J_{4}. Later, J_{2}, J_{3} and J_{4} were all shown to exist.

J_{1} was the first sporadic simple group discovered in nearly a century: until then only the Mathieu groups were known, M_{11} and M_{12} having been found in 1861, and M_{22}, M_{23} and M_{24} in 1873. The discovery of J_{1} caused a great "sensation" and "surprise" among group theory specialists. This began the modern theory of sporadic groups.

And in a sense, J_{4} ended it. It would be the last sporadic group (and, since the non-sporadic families had already been found, the last finite simple group) predicted and discovered, though this could only be said in hindsight when the Classification theorem was completed.
