= Pariah group =

Sporadic group that is not a subquotient of the monster

Relationships among the sporadic simple groups. The monster group M is at the top, and the groups which are descended from it are the happy family. The six which are not connected by an upward path to M (white ellipses) are the pariahs.

In group theory, the term pariah was introduced by Robert Griess in Griess (1982) to refer to the six sporadic simple groups which are not subquotients of the monster group.

The twenty groups which are subquotients, including the monster group itself, he dubbed the happy family.

For example, the orders of J_{4} and the Lyons Group Ly are divisible by 37. Since 37 does not divide the order of the monster, these cannot be subquotients of it; thus J_{4} and Ly are pariahs. Three other sporadic groups were also shown to be pariahs by Griess in 1982, and the Janko Group J_{1} was shown to be the final pariah by Robert A. Wilson in 1986.

== The pariah groups ==
List of pariah groups
Group	Size	Approx. size	Factorized order	First missing prime in order
Lyons group, Ly	51765179004000000	5×10^{16}	2^{8} · 3^{7} · 5^{6} · 7 · 11 · 31 · 37 · 67	13
O'Nan group, O'N	460815505920	5×10^{11}	2^{9} · 3^{4} · 5 · 7^{3} · 11 · 19 · 31	13
Rudvalis group, Ru	145926144000	1×10^{11}	2^{14} · 3^{3} · 5^{3} · 7 · 13 · 29	11
Janko group, J_{4}	86775571046077562880	9×10^{19}	2^{21} · 3^{3} · 5 · 7 · 11^{3} · 23 · 29 · 31 · 37 · 43	13
Janko group, J_{3}	50232960	5×10^{7}	2^{7} · 3^{5} · 5 · 17 · 19	7
Janko group, J_{1}	175560	2×10^{5}	2^{3} · 3 · 5 · 7 · 11 · 19	13

=== Lyons group ===
The Lyons group, $Ly$, is the unique group (up to isomorphism) that has in involution $t$ where $C_G(t)$ is the covering group of the alternating group $A_{11}$, and $t$ is not weakly closed in $C_G(t)$. Richard Lyons, the namesake of these groups, was the first to consider their properties, including their order, and Charles Sims proved with machine calculation that such a group must exist and be unique. The group has an order of $2^8 \cdot 3^7 \cdot 5^6 \cdot 7 \cdot 11 \cdot 31 \cdot 37 \cdot 67$.

=== O'Nan group ===
In the area of abstract algebra known as group theory, the O'Nan group O'N or O'Nan–Sims group is a sporadic simple group of order

460,815,505,920 = 2^{9} · 3^{4} · 5 · 7^{3} · 11 · 19 · 31 ≈ 5×10^{11}.

=== Rudvalis group ===
The Rudvalis group is a finite simple group $R$ that is a rank 3 permutation group on 4060 letters where the stabilizer of a point is the Ree group. The group was described by Arunas Rudvalis, who proved the existence of such a group. This group has order of $145,926,144,000=2^{14} \cdot 3^3 \cdot 5^3 \cdot 7 \cdot 13 \cdot 29$.

=== Janko groups ===
==== J_{4} ====
In the area of modern algebra known as group theory, the Janko group J_{4} is a sporadic simple group of order

86,775,571,046,077,562,880
= 2^{21} · 3^{3} · 5 · 7 · 11^{3} · 23 · 29 · 31 · 37 · 43
≈ 9×10^{19}.

==== J_{3} ====
In the area of modern algebra known as group theory, the Janko group J_{3} or the Higman-Janko-McKay group HJM is a sporadic simple group of order

50,232,960 = 2^{7} · 3^{5} · 5 · 17 · 19.

==== J_{1} ====
In the area of modern algebra known as group theory, the Janko group J_{1} is a sporadic simple group of order

175,560 = 2^{3} · 3 · 5 · 7 · 11 · 19
≈ 2×10^{5}.
