= Lyons group =

Sporadic simple group

In the area of modern algebra known as group theory, the Lyons group Ly or Lyons-Sims group LyS is a sporadic simple group of order

51,765,179,004,000,000
= 2^{8} · 3^{7} · 5^{6} · 7 · 11 · 31 · 37 · 67
≈ 5×10^{16}.

== History ==
Ly is one of the 26 sporadic groups and was discovered by Richard Lyons and Charles Sims in 1972-73. Lyons characterized 51765179004000000 as the unique possible order of any finite simple group where the centralizer of some involution is isomorphic to the nontrivial central extension of the alternating group A_{11} of degree 11 by the cyclic group C_{2}. Sims (1973) proved the existence of such a group and its uniqueness up to isomorphism with a combination of permutation group theory and machine calculations. In 2002, Ulrich Meierfrankenfeld and Chris Parker gave a computer-free construction of the Lyons group, as an amalgam of its maximal 3-local subgroups.

When the McLaughlin sporadic group was discovered, it was noticed that a centralizer of one of its involutions was the perfect double cover of the alternating group A_{8}. This suggested considering the double covers of the other alternating groups A_{n} as possible centralizers of involutions in simple groups. The cases n ≤ 7 are ruled out by the Brauer–Suzuki theorem, the case n = 8 leads to the McLaughlin group, the case n = 9 was ruled out by Zvonimir Janko, Lyons himself ruled out the case n = 10 and found the Lyons group for n = 11, while the cases n ≥ 12 were ruled out by J.G. Thompson and Ronald Solomon.

The Schur multiplier and the outer automorphism group are both trivial.

Since 37 and 67 are not supersingular primes, the Lyons group cannot be a subquotient of the monster group. Thus it is one of the 6 sporadic groups called the pariahs.

== Representations ==
Meyer, Neutsch & Parker (1985) showed that the Lyons group has a modular representation of dimension 111 over the field of five elements, which is the smallest dimension of any faithful linear representation and is one of the easiest ways of calculating with it. It has also been given by several complicated presentations in terms of generators and relations, for instance those given by Sims (1973) or Gebhardt (2000).

The smallest faithful permutation representation is a rank 5 permutation representation on 8835156 points with stabilizer G_{2}(5). There is also a slightly larger rank 5 permutation representation on 9606125 points with stabilizer 3.McL:2.

The degrees of irreducible representations of the Lyons group are 1, 2480, 2480, 45694, 48174, ... (sequence A003917 in the OEIS).

== Maximal subgroups ==
Wilson (1985) found the 9 conjugacy classes of maximal subgroups of Ly as follows:

Maximal subgroups of Ly
No.	Structure	Order	Index	Comments
1	G_{2}(5)	5,859,000,000 = 2^{6}·3^{3}·5^{6}·7·31	8,835,156 = 2^{2}·3^{4}·11·37·67	
2	3^{·}McL:2	5,388,768,000 = 2^{8}·3^{7}·5^{3}·7·11	9,606,125 = 5^{3}·31·37·67	normalizer of a subgroup of order 3 (class 3A)
3	5^{3·}L_{3}(5)	46,500,000 = 2^{5}·3·5^{6}·31	1,113,229,656 = 2^{3}·3^{6}·7·11·37·67	
4	2^{·}A_{11}	39,916,800 = 2^{8}·3^{4}·5^{2}·7·11	1,296,826,875 = 3^{3}·5^{4}·31·37·67	centralizer of an involution
5	5^{1+4}:4.S_{6}	9,000,000 = 2^{6}·3^{2}·5^{6}	5,751,686,556 = 2^{2}·3^{5}·7·11·31·37·67	normalizer of a subgroup of order 5 (class 5A)
6	3^{5}:(2 × M_{11})	3,849,120 = 2^{5}·3^{7}·5·11	13,448,575,000 = 2^{3}·5^{5}·7·31·37·67	
7	3^{2+4}:2.A_{5}.D_{8}	699,840 = 2^{6}·3^{7}·5	73,967,162,500 = 2^{2}·5^{5}·7·11·31·37·67	
8	67:22	1,474 = 2·11·67	35,118,846,000,000 = 2^{7}·3^{7}·5^{6}·7·31·37	
9	37:18	666 = 2·3^{2}·37	77,725,494,000,000 = 2^{7}·3^{5}·5^{6}·7·11·31·67	
