= Dieter Held =

German mathematician

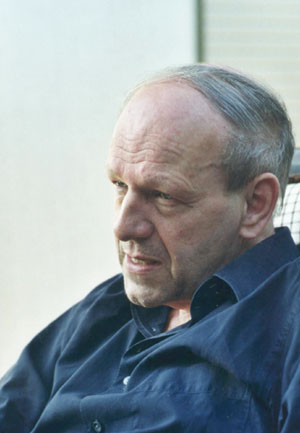
Dieter Held (1999)

Dieter Held (born 1936 in Berlin) is a German mathematician. He is known for discovering the Held group, one of the 26 sporadic finite simple groups.

Held was a speaker at the 1962 International Congress of Mathematicians. He earned his Ph.D. in 1964 from Goethe University Frankfurt, under the supervision of Reinhold Baer. From June 1965 to October 1967 Held first was lecturer at the Australian National University till July 1966 and then lecturer at Monash University, Clayton, Victoria. After having resigned from his position at Monash University, he returned to Germany and took up a research fellowship from the Deutsche Forschungsgemeinschaft (DFG). The discovery of the Held group occurred towards the end of 1968 after he had investigated the properties of an arbitrary finite simple group having a centralizer of an involution isomorphic to that of the centralizer of an involution in the center of a Sylow 2-subgroup of the Mathieu group M_{24} on 24 letters. Shortly afterwards Graham Higman and John McKay demonstrated that such a group exists, using a computer. This demonstration has not been published. There is a much later paper by Jörg Hrabe de Angelis showing the existence and uniqueness of the Held group.

Up to 2001, Held was professor at the Mathematics Institute of Gutenberg University in Mainz.
