= List of simple groups =

List of simple groups may refer to:

- List of finite simple groups
- List of simple Lie groups
