= Janko group J3 =

Sporadic simple group

In the area of modern algebra known as group theory, the Janko group J_{3} or the Higman-Janko-McKay group HJM is a sporadic simple group of order

50,232,960 = 2^{7} · 3^{5} · 5 · 17 · 19.

== History and properties ==
J_{3} is one of the 26 Sporadic groups and was predicted by Zvonimir Janko in 1969 as one of two new simple groups having 2^{1+4}:A_{5} as a centralizer of an involution (the other is the Janko group J_{2}). J_{3} was shown to exist by Graham Higman and John McKay (1969).

In 1982 R. L. Griess showed that J_{3} cannot be a subquotient of the monster group. Thus it is one of the 6 sporadic groups called the pariahs.

J_{3} has an outer automorphism group of order 2 and a Schur multiplier of order 3, and its triple cover has a unitary 9-dimensional representation over the finite field with 4 elements. Weiss (1982) constructed it via an underlying geometry. It has a modular representation of dimension eighteen over the finite field with 9 elements. It has a complex projective representation of dimension eighteen.

The degrees of irreducible representations of the Janko group J_{3} are 1, 85, 85, 323, 323, 324, ... (sequence A003906 in the OEIS).

== Constructions ==
=== Using matrices ===
J3 can be constructed by many different generators. Two from the ATLAS list are 18×18 matrices over the finite field of order 9, with matrix multiplication carried out with finite field arithmetic:

$$\left( \begin{matrix}
0 & 8 & 0 & 0 & 0 & 0 & 0 & 0 & 0 & 0 & 0 & 0 & 0 & 0 & 0 & 0 & 0 & 0 \\
8 & 0 & 0 & 0 & 0 & 0 & 0 & 0 & 0 & 0 & 0 & 0 & 0 & 0 & 0 & 0 & 0 & 0 \\
0 & 0 & 0 & 8 & 0 & 0 & 0 & 0 & 0 & 0 & 0 & 0 & 0 & 0 & 0 & 0 & 0 & 0 \\
0 & 0 & 8 & 0 & 0 & 0 & 0 & 0 & 0 & 0 & 0 & 0 & 0 & 0 & 0 & 0 & 0 & 0 \\
0 & 0 & 0 & 0 & 0 & 8 & 0 & 0 & 0 & 0 & 0 & 0 & 0 & 0 & 0 & 0 & 0 & 0 \\
0 & 0 & 0 & 0 & 8 & 0 & 0 & 0 & 0 & 0 & 0 & 0 & 0 & 0 & 0 & 0 & 0 & 0 \\
0 & 0 & 0 & 0 & 0 & 0 & 0 & 0 & 8 & 0 & 0 & 0 & 0 & 0 & 0 & 0 & 0 & 0 \\
0 & 0 & 0 & 0 & 0 & 0 & 0 & 0 & 0 & 8 & 0 & 0 & 0 & 0 & 0 & 0 & 0 & 0 \\
0 & 0 & 0 & 0 & 0 & 0 & 8 & 0 & 0 & 0 & 0 & 0 & 0 & 0 & 0 & 0 & 0 & 0 \\
0 & 0 & 0 & 0 & 0 & 0 & 0 & 8 & 0 & 0 & 0 & 0 & 0 & 0 & 0 & 0 & 0 & 0 \\
0 & 0 & 0 & 0 & 0 & 0 & 0 & 0 & 0 & 0 & 0 & 0 & 0 & 8 & 0 & 0 & 0 & 0 \\
0 & 0 & 0 & 0 & 0 & 0 & 0 & 0 & 0 & 0 & 0 & 0 & 0 & 0 & 8 & 0 & 0 & 0 \\
3 & 7 & 4 & 8 & 4 & 8 & 1 & 5 & 5 & 1 & 2 & 0 & 8 & 6 & 0 & 0 & 0 & 0 \\
0 & 0 & 0 & 0 & 0 & 0 & 0 & 0 & 0 & 0 & 8 & 0 & 0 & 0 & 0 & 0 & 0 & 0 \\
0 & 0 & 0 & 0 & 0 & 0 & 0 & 0 & 0 & 0 & 0 & 8 & 0 & 0 & 0 & 0 & 0 & 0 \\
0 & 0 & 0 & 0 & 0 & 0 & 0 & 0 & 0 & 0 & 0 & 0 & 0 & 0 & 0 & 0 & 0 & 8 \\
4 & 8 & 6 & 2 & 4 & 8 & 0 & 4 & 0 & 8 & 4 & 5 & 0 & 8 & 1 & 1 & 8 & 5 \\
0 & 0 & 0 & 0 & 0 & 0 & 0 & 0 & 0 & 0 & 0 & 0 & 0 & 0 & 0 & 8 & 0 & 0 \\
\end{matrix} \right)$$

and

$$\left( \begin{matrix}
4 & 8 & 0 & 0 & 0 & 0 & 0 & 0 & 0 & 0 & 0 & 0 & 0 & 0 & 0 & 0 & 0 & 0 \\
0 & 0 & 8 & 0 & 0 & 0 & 0 & 0 & 0 & 0 & 0 & 0 & 0 & 0 & 0 & 0 & 0 & 0 \\
4 & 4 & 8 & 0 & 0 & 0 & 0 & 0 & 0 & 0 & 0 & 0 & 0 & 0 & 0 & 0 & 0 & 0 \\
0 & 0 & 0 & 0 & 8 & 0 & 0 & 0 & 0 & 0 & 0 & 0 & 0 & 0 & 0 & 0 & 0 & 0 \\
0 & 0 & 0 & 0 & 0 & 0 & 8 & 0 & 0 & 0 & 0 & 0 & 0 & 0 & 0 & 0 & 0 & 0 \\
0 & 0 & 0 & 0 & 0 & 0 & 0 & 8 & 0 & 0 & 0 & 0 & 0 & 0 & 0 & 0 & 0 & 0 \\
0 & 0 & 0 & 8 & 0 & 0 & 0 & 0 & 0 & 0 & 0 & 0 & 0 & 0 & 0 & 0 & 0 & 0 \\
0 & 0 & 0 & 0 & 0 & 0 & 0 & 0 & 0 & 0 & 8 & 0 & 0 & 0 & 0 & 0 & 0 & 0 \\
0 & 0 & 0 & 0 & 0 & 0 & 0 & 0 & 0 & 0 & 0 & 8 & 0 & 0 & 0 & 0 & 0 & 0 \\
0 & 0 & 0 & 0 & 0 & 0 & 0 & 0 & 0 & 0 & 0 & 0 & 8 & 0 & 0 & 0 & 0 & 0 \\
0 & 0 & 0 & 0 & 0 & 8 & 0 & 0 & 0 & 0 & 0 & 0 & 0 & 0 & 0 & 0 & 0 & 0 \\
0 & 0 & 0 & 0 & 0 & 0 & 0 & 0 & 0 & 0 & 0 & 0 & 0 & 0 & 0 & 8 & 0 & 0 \\
0 & 0 & 0 & 0 & 0 & 0 & 0 & 0 & 0 & 0 & 0 & 0 & 0 & 0 & 0 & 0 & 8 & 0 \\
2 & 7 & 4 & 5 & 7 & 4 & 8 & 5 & 6 & 7 & 2 & 2 & 8 & 8 & 0 & 0 & 5 & 0 \\
4 & 7 & 5 & 8 & 6 & 1 & 1 & 6 & 5 & 3 & 8 & 7 & 5 & 0 & 8 & 8 & 6 & 0 \\
0 & 0 & 0 & 0 & 0 & 0 & 0 & 0 & 8 & 0 & 0 & 0 & 0 & 0 & 0 & 0 & 0 & 0 \\
0 & 0 & 0 & 0 & 0 & 0 & 0 & 0 & 0 & 8 & 0 & 0 & 0 & 0 & 0 & 0 & 0 & 0 \\
8 & 2 & 5 & 5 & 7 & 2 & 8 & 1 & 5 & 5 & 7 & 8 & 6 & 0 & 0 & 7 & 3 & 8 \\
\end{matrix} \right)$$

=== Using the subgroup PSL(2,16) ===
The automorphism group J_{3}:2 can be constructed by starting with the subgroup PSL(2,16):4 and adjoining 120 involutions, which are identified with the Sylow 17-subgroups. Note that these 120 involutions are outer elements of J_{3}:2. One then defines the following relation:

$$\left(\begin{matrix}1&1\\1&0\end{matrix}\sigma t_{(\nu,\nu7)}\right)^5=1$$

where $\sigma$ is the Frobenius automorphism of order 4, and $t_{(\nu,\nu7)}$ is the unique 17-cycle that sends

$\infty\rightarrow0\rightarrow1\rightarrow7$

Curtis showed, using a computer, that this relation is sufficient to define J_{3}:2.

=== Using a presentation ===
In terms of generators a, b, c, and d its automorphism group J_{3}:2 can be presented as $a^{17} = b^8 = a^ba^{-2} = c^2 = b^cb^3 = (abc)^4 = (ac)^{17} = d^2 = [d, a] = [d, b] = (a^3b^{-3}cd)^5 = 1.$

A presentation for J_{3} in terms of (different) generators a, b, c, d is $a^{19} = b^9 = a^ba^2 = c^2 = d^2 = (bc)^2 = (bd)^2 = (ac)^3 = (ad)^3 = (a^2ca^{-3}d)^3 = 1.$

== Maximal subgroups ==
Finkelstein & Rudvalis (1974) found the 9 conjugacy classes of maximal subgroups of J_{3} as follows:

Maximal subgroups of J_{3}
No.	Structure	Order	Index	Comments
1	L_{2}(16):2	8,160 = 2^{5}·3·5·17	6,156 = 2^{2}·3^{4}·19	
2,3	L_{2}(19)	3,420 = 2^{2}·3^{2}·5·19	14,688 = 2^{5}·3^{3}·17	two classes, fused by an outer automorphism
4	2^{4}: (3 × A_{5})	2,880 = 2^{6}·3^{2}·5	17,442 = 2·3^{3}·17·19	
5	L_{2}(17)	2,448 = 2^{4}·3^{2}·17	20,520 = 2^{3}·3^{3}·5·19	centralizer of an outer automorphism of order 2
6	(3 × A_{6}):2_{2}	2,160 = 2^{4}·3^{3}·5	23,256 = 2^{3}·3^{2}·17·19	normalizer of a subgroup of order 3 (class 3A)
7	3^{2+1+2}:8	1,944 = 2^{3}·3^{5}	25,840 = 2^{4}·5·17·19	normalizer of a Sylow 3-subgroup
8	2^{1+4}_{–}:A_{5}	1,920 = 2^{7}·3·5	26,163 = 3^{4}·17·19	centralizer of involution
9	2^{2+4}: (3 × S_{3})	1,152 = 2^{7}·3^{2}	43,605 = 3^{3}·5·17·19	
