= Bimonster group =

Mathematical group

In mathematics, the bimonster is a group that is the wreath product of the monster group M with Z_{2}:

$$Bi = M \wr \mathbb{Z}_2. \,$$

The Bimonster is also a quotient of the Coxeter group corresponding to the Dynkin diagram Y_{555}, a Y-shaped graph with 16 nodes:

Actually, the 3 outermost nodes are redundant. This is because the subgroup Y_{124} is the E_{8} Coxeter group. It generates the remaining node of Y_{125}. This pattern extends all the way to Y_{444}: it automatically generates the 3 extra nodes of Y_{555}.

John H. Conway conjectured that a presentation of the bimonster could be given by adding a certain extra relation to the presentation defined by the Y_{444} diagram. More specifically, the affine E_{6} Coxeter group is $\mathbb{Z}^6:O_5(3):2$, which can be reduced to the finite group $3^5:O_5(3):2$ by adding a single relation called the spider relation. Once this relation is added, and the diagram is extended to Y_{444}, the group generated is the bimonster. This was proved in 1990 by Simon P. Norton; the proof was simplified in 1999 by A. A. Ivanov.

== Other Y-groups ==
Many subgroups of the (bi)monster can be defined by adjoining the spider relation to smaller Coxeter diagrams, most notably the Fischer groups and the baby monster group. The groups Y_{0ij}, Y_{11i}, Y_{122}, Y_{123}, and Y_{124} are finite even without adjoining additional relations. They are the Coxeter groups A_{i+j+1}, D_{i+3}, E_{6}, E_{7}, and E_{8}, respectively. Other groups, which would be infinite without the spider relation, are summarized below:

Y-group name	Group generated
Y_{222}	$3^5:O_5(3):2$
Y_{223}	$O_7(3)\times2$
Y_{224}	$O_8^+(3):2$ (Note: This is the group obtained when realizing Y_{224} as a subgroup of larger Y-group. However, if we simply adjoin the spider relation to the Coxeter group, we obtain the double cover $2\cdot O_8^+(3):2$.)
Y_{133}	$2^7:(O_7(2)\times2)$ (Note: The spider relation can only be defined directly if the diagram has at least 2 nodes in all 3 directions. However, it is possible to define the spider relation for a larger group, then consider the subgroup generated by fewer nodes.)
Y_{134}	$O_9(2)\times2$
Y_{144}	$O_{10}^-(2):2$
Y_{233}	$2\times2Fi_{22}$
Y_{234}	$2\times Fi_{23}$
Y_{244}	$3\cdot Fi_{24}$
Y_{333}	$2\times2^2\cdot\,^2E_6(2)$
Y_{334}	$2\times2\mathbb{B}$
Y_{344}	$2\times\mathbb{M}$
Y_{444}	$\mathbb{M}\wr2$ (Note: As mentioned before, the 3 outermost nodes of Y_{555} are redundant, so Y_{444} is sufficient to generate the bimonster.)

== See also ==
- Triality - simple Lie group D_{4}, Y_{111}
- Affine E_6 Y_{222}
