= Griess algebra =

Type of high-dimensional algebra

In mathematics, the Griess algebra is a commutative non-associative algebra on a real vector space of dimension 196884 that has the Monster group as its automorphism group. It is named after mathematician Robert Griess, who constructed it in 1980 to prove the existence of the Monster group.

== Matrix representation size ==
To visualize the complexity of the Monster group $M$, an individual element $g \in M$, when acting on the 196883-dimensional irreducible subspace $W$, can be represented as a square matrix:

$$g = \begin{pmatrix}
g_{1,1} & g_{1,2} & \dots & g_{1,196883} \\
g_{2,1} & g_{2,2} & \dots & g_{2,196883} \\
\vdots & \vdots & \ddots & \vdots \\
g_{196883,1} & g_{196883,2} & \dots & g_{196883,196883}
\end{pmatrix}$$

The sheer quantity of entries ($196883^2 \approx 3.8 \times 10^{10}$) means that storing just one such matrix explicitly, even over a small finite field like $\mathbb{F}_2$ (1 bit per entry), requires approximately 4.5 GB of data storage.

== History ==
In 1973, Bernd Fischer and Robert Griess independently produced evidence for the existence of the Monster group. However, for several years, the group remained a conjecture because its immense order (approx. $8 \times 10^{53}$) made computer construction impossible at the time. To prove its existence, Griess undertook the task of constructing a specific mathematical object upon which this group would act naturally. This resulted in the 196884-dimensional algebra, announced in 1980 and published in 1982.

=== Classification of finite simple groups ===
The construction of the Griess algebra was a pivotal moment in the classification of finite simple groups. By the 1970s, mathematicians had categorized most simple groups into infinite families, but were left with 26 exceptional cases known as sporadic groups. The Monster was the largest of these. Griess's manual construction of the algebra provided the physical model for the Monster, bridging the gap between theoretical prediction and existence.

== Structure and properties ==
The algebra is equipped with a positive definite symmetric bilinear form (inner product) invariant under the Monster group, satisfying the identity

$$\langle xy, z \rangle = \langle x, yz \rangle.$$

The dimension 196884 arises from the decomposition of the algebra into invariant subspaces:

$$V = \mathbb{R}\mathbf{1} \oplus W$$

- The 1-dimensional subspace $\R\mathbf{1}$: Spanned by a specific element fixed by the group.
- The 196883-dimensional subspace $W$: The orthogonal complement, where the Monster acts absolutely irreducibly.

This dimension relates to monstrous moonshine, corresponding to the linear term coefficient in the j-function ($196884 = 1 + 196883$).

== Construction ==
Griess originally constructed the algebra as a direct sum of two vector spaces related to the Leech lattice. This construction was later simplified by Jacques Tits and John H. Conway. The Griess algebra is also identified as the degree 2 piece of the monster vertex algebra. The Monster fixes (vectorwise) a 1-space in this algebra and acts absolutely irreducibly on the 196883-dimensional orthogonal complement of this 1-space. (The Monster preserves the standard inner product on the 196884-space.)
