= Kristina Reiss =

German mathematics educator

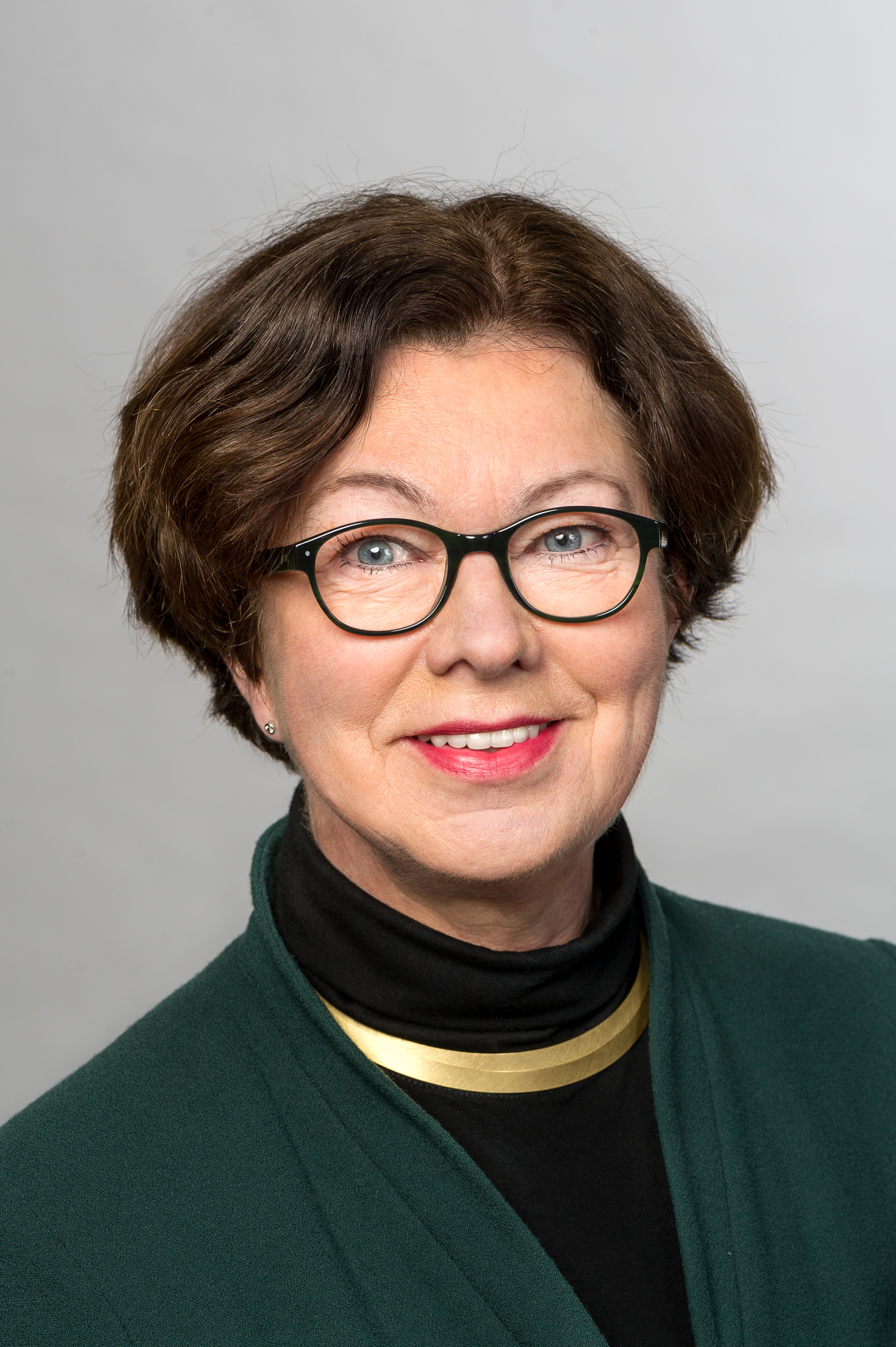
Kristina Reiss

Kristina Reiss (born 1952) is a German mathematics educator. She is professor of mathematics education and Emerita of Excellence at the Technical University of Munich, where she held the Heinz Nixdorf Chair of Mathematics Education from 2009 until 2021.

== Education and career ==
Reiss studied mathematics beginning in 1971 at Heidelberg University, completing her doctorate (Dr. rer. nat.) there in 1980. Her dissertation, Eine allgemeinere Kennzeichnung der sporadischen einfachen Gruppe von Rudvalis, concerned group theory and was supervised by Zvonimir Janko.

She worked as a researcher at the Karlsruhe University of Education from 1980 until 1991, when she became a professor of mathematics at the Stuttgart Technology University of Applied Sciences. She moved in 1992 to the University of Flensburg, in 1997 to the University of Oldenburg, in 2002 to the University of Augsburg, and in 2005 to LMU Munich as a professor of mathematics and computer science education. In 2009, she became Heinz Nixdorf Professor of Mathematics Education at the Technical University of Munich (TUM). Between 2014 and 2021, she has been dean of the TUM School of Education. Kristina Reiss was director of the PISA study in Germany between 2014 and 2021.

== Recognition ==
In 2011 Reiss joined Acatech, the German Academy of Science and Engineering.
