= Zvonimir Janko =

Croatian mathematician (1932–2022)

- Born: 26 July 1932; Bjelovar, Kingdom of Yugoslavia
- Died: 12 April 2022 (aged 89); Heidelberg, Germany
- Education: University of Zagreb
- Known for: Janko groups
- Scientific career
- Fields: Mathematics
- Workplaces: Monash University; Australian National University; Ohio State University; University of Heidelberg
- Doctoral advisor: Vladimir Devidé
- Doctoral students: Kristina Reiss

Zvonimir Janko (26 July 1932 – 12 April 2022) was a Croatian mathematician who was the eponym of the Janko groups, sporadic simple groups in group theory. The first few sporadic simple groups were discovered by Émile Léonard Mathieu, which were then called the Mathieu groups. It was after 90 years of the discovery of the last Mathieu group that Zvonimir Janko constructed a new sporadic simple group in 1964. In his honour, this group is now called J_{1}. This discovery launched the modern theory of sporadic groups and it was an important milestone in the classification of finite simple groups.

== Biography ==
Janko was born in Bjelovar, Croatia. He studied at the University of Zagreb where he received Ph.D. in 1960, with advisor Vladimir Devidé. The title of the thesis was Dekompozicija nekih klasa nedegeneriranih Rédeiovih grupa na Schreierova proširenja (Decomposition of some classes of nondegenerate Rédei Groups on Schreier extensions), in which he solved a problem posed by László Rédei. He then taught physics at a high school in Široki Brijeg in Bosnia and Herzegovina.

In 1962 Janko decided to leave Yugoslavia for Australia, where he first taught at Monash University in Melbourne. In 1964 he joined as full professor the Australian National University in Canberra. He then moved in 1968 to the United States, where he first was a visiting professor at Princeton University, and then full professor at the Ohio State University. In 1970 he was an invited speaker at the International Congress of Mathematicians in Nice. In 1972 Janko moved to Germany, where he was a full professor at Heidelberg University until his retirement in 2000.

Janko discovered his first sporadic simple group (called J_{1}) in 1964, when he was at the Australian National University. This was followed in 1966 by the prediction of J_{2}, whose existence was established in 1968 by Marshall Hall and David Wales, and J_{3}, whose existence was established in 1969 by Graham Higman and John McKay. Finally, Janko found the group J_{4} in 1975; its existence was confirmed in 1980 by Simon P. Norton and others using computer calculations.

== See also ==
- Iwasawa group
- Lyons group
- Thin group (finite group theory)
