= Sporadic group =

Finite simple group type not classified as Lie, cyclic or alternating

In the mathematical classification of finite simple groups, there are a number of groups which do not fit into any infinite family. These are called the sporadic simple groups, or the sporadic finite groups, or just the sporadic groups.

A simple group is a group G that does not have any normal subgroups except for the trivial group and G itself. The mentioned classification theorem states that the list of finite simple groups consists of 18 countably infinite families (Note: The cyclic groups of prime order, the alternating groups of degree at least 5, and 16 families of groups of Lie type, including the infinite family of commutator groups ^{2}F_{4}(2^{2n+1})′ that contains the Tits group.) plus 26 exceptions that do not follow such a systematic pattern. These 26 exceptions are the sporadic groups. The Tits group is sometimes regarded as a sporadic group because it is not strictly a group of Lie type, in which case there would be 27 sporadic groups.

The monster group, or friendly giant, is the largest of the sporadic groups, and all but six of the other sporadic groups are subquotients of it.

== Names ==
Five of the sporadic groups were discovered by Émile Mathieu in the 1860s and the other twenty-one were found between 1965 (J_{1}) and 1975 (J_{4}). Several of these groups were predicted to exist before they were constructed. Most of the groups are named after the mathematician(s) who first predicted their existence. The full list is:

The diagram shows the subquotient relations between the 26 sporadic groups. A connecting line means the lower group is subquotient of the upper – and no sporadic subquotient in between: 1st generation (Mathieu groups) 2nd generation (Leech lattice groups) 3rd generation (Fischer's 3-transposition groups and other Monster centralizers) Pariahs (half-dozen oddments) Classifications from Griess, Jr. (1982) and Conway et al. (1985)

- Mathieu groups M_{11}, M_{12}, M_{22}, M_{23}, M_{24}
- Janko groups J_{1}, J_{2} or HJ, J_{3} or HJM, J_{4}
- Conway groups Co_{1}, Co_{2}, Co_{3}
- Fischer groups Fi_{22}, Fi_{23}, Fi_{24}′ or F_{3+}
- Higman-Sims group HS
- McLaughlin group McL
- Held group He or F_{7+} or F_{7}
- Rudvalis group Ru
- Suzuki group Suz or F_{3−}
- O'Nan group O'N (ON)
- Harada-Norton group HN or F_{5+} or F_{5}
- Lyons group Ly
- Thompson group Th or F_{3|3} or F_{3}
- Baby Monster group B or F_{2+} or F_{2}
- Fischer-Griess Monster group M or F_{1}

Various constructions for these groups were first compiled in Conway et al. (1985), including character tables, individual conjugacy classes and lists of maximal subgroup, as well as Schur multipliers and orders of their outer automorphisms. These are also listed online at Wilson et al. (1999), updated with their group presentations and semi-presentations. The degrees of minimal faithful representation or Brauer characters over fields of characteristic p ≥ 0 for all sporadic groups have also been calculated, and for some of their covering groups. These are detailed in Jansen (2005). A further exception in the classification of finite simple groups is the Tits group T, which is sometimes considered of Lie type or sporadic — it is almost but not strictly a group of Lie type — which is why in some sources the number of sporadic groups is given as 27, instead of 26.

The diagram at right is based on Ronan (2006, p. 247). It does not show the numerous non-sporadic simple subquotients of the sporadic groups. The earliest use of the term sporadic group may be Burnside (1911, p. 504) where he comments about the Mathieu groups: "These apparently sporadic simple groups would probably repay a closer examination than they have yet received." (At the time, the other sporadic groups had not been discovered.)

== Organization ==
=== Happy Family ===
Of the 26 (or 27) sporadic groups, 20 can be seen inside the monster group as subgroups or quotients of subgroups (sections). These twenty have been called the happy family by Robert Griess, and can be organized into three generations. (Note: Conway et al. (1985, p. viii) organizes the 26 sporadic groups in likeness: "The sporadic simple groups may be roughly sorted as the Mathieu groups, the Leech lattice groups, Fischer's 3-transposition groups, the further Monster centralizers, and the half-dozen oddments.")

==== First generation (5 groups): the Mathieu groups ====
M_{n} for n = 11, 12, 22, 23 and 24 are multiply transitive permutation groups on n points. They are all subgroups of M_{24}, which is a permutation group on 24 points.

==== Second generation (7 groups): the Leech lattice ====
All the subquotients of the automorphism group of a lattice in 24 dimensions called the Leech lattice:

- Co_{1} is the quotient of the automorphism group by its center {±1}
- Co_{2} is the stabilizer of a type 2 (i.e., length 2) vector
- Co_{3} is the stabilizer of a type 3 (i.e., length √6) vector
- Suz is the group of automorphisms preserving a complex structure (modulo its center)
- McL is the stabilizer of a type 2-2-3 triangle
- HS is the stabilizer of a type 2-3-3 triangle
- J_{2} is the group of automorphisms preserving a quaternionic structure (modulo its center).

==== Third generation (8 groups): other subgroups of the Monster ====
Consists of subgroups which are closely related to the Monster group M:

- B or F_{2} has a double cover which is the centralizer of an element of order 2 in M
- Fi_{24}′ has a triple cover which is the centralizer of an element of order 3 in M (in conjugacy class "3A")
- Fi_{23} is a subgroup of Fi_{24}′
- Fi_{22} has a double cover which is a subgroup of Fi_{23}
- The product of Th = F_{3} and a group of order 3 is the centralizer of an element of order 3 in M (in conjugacy class "3C")
- The product of HN = F_{5} and a group of order 5 is the centralizer of an element of order 5 in M
- The product of He = F_{7} and a group of order 7 is the centralizer of an element of order 7 in M.
- Finally, the Monster group itself is considered to be in this generation.

(This series continues further: the product of M_{12} and a group of order 11 is the centralizer of an element of order 11 in M.)

=== Pariahs ===
The six sporadic groups which are not subquotients of the monster group M are J_{1}, J_{3}, J_{4}, O'N, Ru, and Ly, sometimes known as the pariahs.

=== Tits group ===
If regarded as a sporadic group, the Tits group ^{2}F_{4}(2)′ (T for short) would be a third generation group. There is a subgroup S_{4}×^{2}F_{4}(2)′ normalizing a 2C^{2} subgroup of the Baby monster B, giving rise to a subgroup 2·S_{4}×^{2}F_{4}(2)′ normalizing a certain Q_{8} subgroup of the Monster M. ^{2}F_{4}(2)′ is also a subquotient of the Fischer group Fi_{22}, and thus also of Fi_{23} and Fi_{24}′, and of the Baby Monster B; involvement of T outside of third-generation sporadic groups, is only seen as being a subquotient of the (pariah) Rudvalis group Ru. T has no part in sporadic simple groups except the ones already mentioned. In terms of classification as a finite simple group, T is the (n=0)–member ^{2}F_{4}(2)′ of the infinite family of commutator groups ^{2}F_{4}(2^{2n+1})′, thus in a strict sense not sporadic, nor of Lie type (sources have historically regarded the Tits group as belonging in either grouping, or as neither sporadic nor of Lie type, or both altogether). For n > 0 these finite simple groups coincide with the groups of Lie type ^{2}F_{4}(2^{2n+1}), also known as Ree groups of type ^{2}F_{4}.

== Assorted table of information ==
Here are listed the sporadic groups by their discovery date, and discoverer, alongside group generation (per Griess), order, minimal degree of faithful representation (dimensional Brauer character), and presentations via generators. The Tits group is included with a greyer shade of blue to reflect its ambiguous status within the classification scheme as a third-generation group.

Group	Discoverer	Year	Generation	Order	Degree of minimal faithful Brauer character	$(a, b, ab)$ Generators	(Note: These are semi-presentations from standard generators of each sporadic group. Most sporadic groups have multiple presentations & semi-presentations; the more prominent examples are listed.) $\langle\langle a,b \mid o(z)\rangle\rangle$ Semi-presentation
M or F_{1}	Fischer, Griess	1973	3rd	808,017,424,794,512,875,886,459,904,961,710,757,005,754,368,000,000,000 = 2^{46}·3^{20}·5^{9}·7^{6}·11^{2}·13^{3}·17·19·23·29·31·41·47·59·71 ≈ 8×10^{53}	196883	2A, 3B, 29	o((ab)^{4}(ab^{2})^{2}) = 50
B or F_{2}	Fischer	1973	3rd	4,154,781,481,226,426,191,177,580,544,000,000 = 2^{41}·3^{13}·5^{6}·7^{2}·11·13·17·19·23·31·47 ≈ 4×10^{33}	4371	2C, 3A, 55	o((ab)^{2}(abab^{2})^{2}ab^{2}) = 23
Fi_{24} or F_{3+}	Fischer	1971	3rd	1,255,205,709,190,661,721,292,800 = 2^{21}·3^{16}·5^{2}·7^{3}·11·13·17·23·29 ≈ 1×10^{24}	8671	2A, 3E, 29	o((ab)^{3}) = 33
Fi_{23}	Fischer	1971	3rd	4,089,470,473,293,004,800 = 2^{18}·3^{13}·5^{2}·7·11·13·17·23 ≈ 4×10^{18}	782	2B, 3D, 28	o(a^{bb}(ab)^{14}) = 5
Fi_{22}	Fischer	1971	3rd	64,561,751,654,400 = 2^{17}·3^{9}·5^{2}·7·11·13 ≈ 6×10^{13}	78	2A, 13, 11	o((ab)^{2}(abab)^{2}ab^{2}) = 12
Th or F_{3}	Thompson	1976	3rd	90,745,943,887,872,000 = 2^{15}·3^{10}·5^{3}·7^{2}·13·19·31 ≈ 9×10^{16}	248	2, 3A, 19	o((ab)^{3}b) = 21
Ly	Lyons	1972	Pariah	51,765,179,004,000,000 = 2^{8}·3^{7}·5^{6}·7·11·31·37·67 ≈ 5×10^{16}	2480	2, 5A, 14	o(ababab^{2}) = 67
HN or F_{5}	Harada, Norton	1976	3rd	273,030,912,000,000 = 2^{14}·3^{6}·5^{6}·7·11·19 ≈ 3×10^{14}	133	2A, 3B, 22	o([a, b]) = 5
Co_{1}	Conway	1969	2nd	4,157,776,806,543,360,000 = 2^{21}·3^{9}·5^{4}·7^{2}·11·13·23 ≈ 4×10^{18}	276	2B, 3C, 40	o(ab(abab^{2})^{2}) = 42
Co_{2}	Conway	1969	2nd	42,305,421,312,000 = 2^{18}·3^{6}·5^{3}·7·11·23 ≈ 4×10^{13}	23	2A, 5A, 28	o([a, b]) = 4
Co_{3}	Conway	1969	2nd	495,766,656,000 = 2^{10}·3^{7}·5^{3}·7·11·23 ≈ 5×10^{11}	23	2A, 7C, 17	o((uvv)^{3}(uv)^{6}) = 5 (Note: Where u = (b^{2}(b^{2})abb)^{3} and v = t(b^{2}(b^{2})t)^{2} with t = abab^{3}a^{2}.)
ON or O'N	O'Nan	1976	Pariah	460,815,505,920 = 2^{9}·3^{4}·5·7^{3}·11·19·31 ≈ 5×10^{11}	10944	2A, 4A, 11	o(abab(b^{2}(b^{2})^{abab})^{5}) = 5
Suz	Suzuki	1969	2nd	448,345,497,600 = 2^{13}·3^{7}·5^{2}·7·11·13 ≈ 4×10^{11}	143	2B, 3B, 13	o([a, b]) = 15
Ru	Rudvalis	1972	Pariah	145,926,144,000 = 2^{14}·3^{3}·5^{3}·7·13·29 ≈ 1×10^{11}	378	2B, 4A, 13	o(abab^{2}) = 29
He or F_{7}	Held	1969	3rd	4,030,387,200 = 2^{10}·3^{3}·5^{2}·7^{3}·17 ≈ 4×10^{9}	51	2A, 7C, 17	o(ab^{2}abab^{2}ab^{2}) = 10
McL	McLaughlin	1969	2nd	898,128,000 = 2^{7}·3^{6}·5^{3}·7·11 ≈ 9×10^{8}	22	2A, 5A, 11	o((ab)^{2}(abab^{2})^{2}ab^{2}) = 7
HS	Higman, Sims	1967	2nd	44,352,000 = 2^{9}·3^{2}·5^{3}·7·11 ≈ 4×10^{7}	22	2A, 5A, 11	o(abab^{2}) = 15
J_{4}	Janko	1976	Pariah	86,775,571,046,077,562,880 = 2^{21}·3^{3}·5·7·11^{3}·23·29·31·37·43 ≈ 9×10^{19}	1333	2A, 4A, 37	o(abab^{2}) = 10
J_{3} or HJM	Janko	1968	Pariah	50,232,960 = 2^{7}·3^{5}·5·17·19 ≈ 5×10^{7}	85	2A, 3A, 19	o([a, b]) = 9
J_{2} or HJ	Janko	1968	2nd	604,800 = 2^{7}·3^{3}·5^{2}·7 ≈ 6×10^{5}	14	2B, 3B, 7	o([a, b]) = 12
J_{1}	Janko	1965	Pariah	175,560 = 2^{3}·3·5·7·11·19 ≈ 2×10^{5}	56	2, 3, 7	o(abab^{2}) = 19
M_{24}	Mathieu	1861	1st	244,823,040 = 2^{10}·3^{3}·5·7·11·23 ≈ 2×10^{8}	23	2B, 3A, 23	o(ab(abab^{2})^{2}ab^{2}) = 4
M_{23}	Mathieu	1861	1st	10,200,960 = 2^{7}·3^{2}·5·7·11·23 ≈ 1×10^{7}	22	2, 4, 23	o((ab)^{2}(abab^{2})^{2}ab^{2}) = 8
M_{22}	Mathieu	1861	1st	443,520 = 2^{7}·3^{2}·5·7·11 ≈ 4×10^{5}	21	2A, 4A, 11	o(abab^{2}) = 11
M_{12}	Mathieu	1861	1st	95,040 = 2^{6}·3^{3}·5·11 ≈ 1×10^{5}	11	2B, 3B, 11	o([a, b]) = o(ababab^{2}) = 6
M_{11}	Mathieu	1861	1st	7,920 = 2^{4}·3^{2}·5·11 ≈ 8×10^{3}	10	2, 4, 11	o((ab)^{2}(abab^{2})^{2}ab^{2}) = 4
T or ^{2}F_{4}(2)′	Tits	1964	3rd	17,971,200 = 2^{11}·3^{3}·5^{2}·13 ≈ 2×10^{7}	104	2A, 3, 13	o([a, b]) = 5
