= Robert Griess =

American mathematician

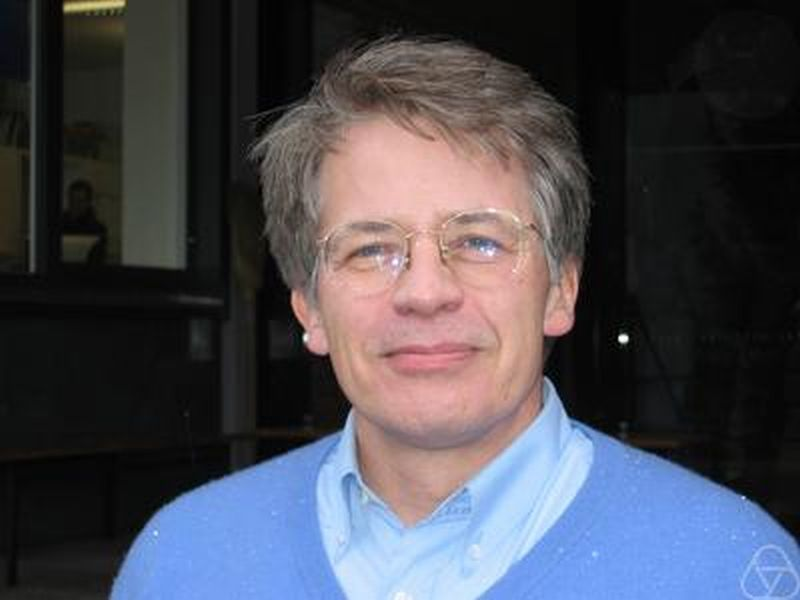
- Born: October 10, 1945 (age 80); Savannah, Georgia
- Education: University of Chicago (B.S., 1967; M.S., 1968; Ph.D., 1971)
- Known for: Classification of sporadic groups (Happy Family and pariahs); Construction of the Fischer–Griess Monster group Gilman–Griess theorem Griess algebra
- Awards: Leroy P. Steele Prize (2010)
- Scientific career
- Fields: Mathematics
- Workplaces: University of Michigan
- Thesis: Schur Multipliers of the Known Finite Simple Groups (1971)
- Doctoral advisor: John Griggs Thompson
- Website: www.math.lsa.umich.edu/~rlg/

Robert Louis Griess Jr. (born 1945) is an American mathematician working on finite simple groups and vertex algebras. He is currently the John Griggs Thompson Distinguished University Professor of mathematics at University of Michigan.

== Education ==
Griess developed a keen interest in mathematics prior to entering undergraduate studies at the University of Chicago in the fall of 1963. There, he eventually earned a Ph.D. in 1971 after defending a dissertation on the Schur multipliers of the then-known finite simple groups.

== Career ==
Griess' work has focused on group extensions, cohomology and Schur multipliers, as well as on vertex operator algebras and the classification of finite simple groups, with emphasis on constructions of the monster group.

=== Friendly Giant ===
In 1982, Robert Griess published the first construction of the largest sporadic group, the monster group $\mathbb M$ (or $F_1$). He first successfully constructed this group while at the Institute for Advanced Study (1979–80, 1981, and later in 1994), through rotations of an object in 196,883-dimensional space.

Originally, Griess called the monster group the "Friendly Giant"; however, a paper published in 1979 by John Horton Conway and Simon P. Norton in the Bulletin of the London Mathematical Society titled "Monstrous Moonshine" formally coins the term. Bernd Fischer and Griess independently predicted the existence of the monster group earlier in the decade, by 1973.

Conway, speaking about the monster group on one occasion (in 2011), expressed Griess' dissatisfaction with his choice in naming the Fischer-Griess 196,883-dimensional group, as the "Monster group":

By the way, Griess criticized me very strongly for using the term monster for it, ... I wrote a postcard to Fischer, who is the first discoverer of the Monster, saying something like, "I've been thinking a lot about your monster group"... he liked that name, and ever since then, it's been called the Monster [...] Griess made the point — and I... I agree with him in a way — that to call it a monster suggests it's sort of ugly, or frightening, or something; and I wasn't thinking of that at all, I was just thinking of it as being tremendously big. You know, maybe a 'bit [sic] frightening in a way, but not ugly, really a beautiful thing...

In the same landmark 1982 paper where he published his construction, Griess detailed an organization of the twenty-six sporadic groups into two general families of groups (the Happy Family and the pariahs).

=== Recognition ===
In 1983 Griess was an invited speaker at the International Congress of Mathematicians in Warsaw to give a lecture on the sporadic groups and his construction of the monster group, as the largest of these geometric groups. In 2010, he was awarded the AMS Leroy P. Steele Prize for Seminal Contribution to Research for his construction of the monster group.

He became a member of the American Academy of Arts and Sciences in 2007, and a fellow of the American Mathematical Society in 2012. In 2020 he became a member of the National Academy of Sciences. Since 2006, Robert Griess has been an editor for Electronic Research Announcements of the AIMS (ERA-AIMS), a peer-review journal.

== Selected publications ==
=== Books ===
- Griess, Robert L. Jr. (1998). Twelve Sporadic Groups. Berlin: Springer-Verlag. ISBN 978-3-540-62778-4. MR 1707296. OCLC 38910263. Zbl 0908.20007.
- Griess, Robert L. Jr. (2011). An Introduction to Groups and Lattices: Finite Groups and Positive Definite Rational Lattices. Advanced Lectures in Mathematics. Vol. 15. Somerville, MA: International Press. ISBN 978-1-57146-206-0. MR 2791918. OCLC 702615699. Zbl 1248.11048.

=== Journal articles ===
- Griess, Robert L. Jr. (1982). "The Friendly Giant" (PDF). Inventiones Mathematicae. 69: 1–102. Bibcode:1982InMat..69....1G. doi:10.1007/BF01389186. hdl:2027.42/46608. MR 0671653. Zbl 0498.20013.
- Gilman, Robert H.; Griess, Robert L. Jr. (1983). "Finite groups with standard components of Lie type over fields of characteristic two" (PDF). Journal of Algebra. 80 (2): 383–516. doi:10.1016/0021-8693(83)90007-8. hdl:2027.42/25314. MR 0691810. Zbl 0508.20010.
- Griess, Robert L. Jr.; Ryba, A. J. E. (1999). "Finite Simple Groups which Projectively Embed in an Exceptional Lie group are Classified!" (PDF). Bulletin of the American Mathematical Society. 36 (1): 75–93. doi:10.1090/S0273-0979-99-00771-5. MR 0165317. Zbl 0916.22008.
- Griess, Robert L. Jr. (2003). "Positive definite lattices of rank at most 8" (PDF). Journal of Number Theory. 103 (1): 77–84. doi:10.1016/S0022-314X(03)00107-0. MR 2008067. Zbl 1044.11014.
- Griess, Robert L. Jr.; Lam, Ching Hung (2011). "A moonshine path from E8 to the Monster" (PDF). Journal of Pure and Applied Algebra. 215 (5): 927–948. doi:10.1016/j.jpaa.2010.07.001. MR 2747229. Zbl 1213.17028.
- Griess, Robert L. Jr. (2012). "Moonshine paths and a VOA existence proof of the Monster". Recent developments in Lie algebras, groups and representation theory. Proc. Sympos. Pure Math. Vol. 86. Providence, RI: Amer. Math. Soc. pp. 165–172. doi:10.1090/pspum/086. ISBN 978-0-8218-6917-8. MR 2977002. Zbl 1320.20018.
- Dong, Chongying; Griess, Robert L. Jr. (2012). "Integral forms in vertex operator algebras which are invariant under finite groups". Journal of Algebra. 365 (3): 184–198. arXiv:1201.3411. MR 2928458. Zbl 0613.17012.
