= Mark Ronan =

British American mathematician

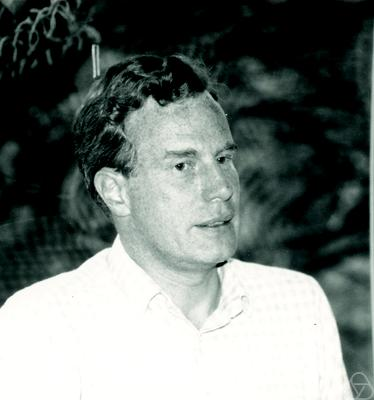
Mark Ronan

Mark Andrew Ronan (born 1947) is Emeritus Professor of Mathematics at the University of Illinois at Chicago and Honorary Professor of Mathematics at University College London. He has lived and taught in: Germany (at the University of Braunschweig and the Free University of Berlin); England, where from 1989 to 1992 he was Mason Professor of Mathematics at the University of Birmingham; and America at the University of Illinois at Chicago, where his teaching included courses on ancient literature from Mesopotamia, and on the history of the calendar, as well as mathematics.

In addition to his research papers, Ronan's popular account of the quest to discover and classify all the finite building blocks for symmetry (the finite simple groups) was published in 2006. In 2008 it formed the basis for a series of BBC radio broadcasts. In his research work he is an expert on the theory of buildings, with a standard text on the subject, now being reissued in paperback. Apart from his professional work, he has acted in many operas at the Lyric Opera of Chicago, danced in the Nutcracker, and maintains a blog on opera, ballet and theatre reviews.

== Bibliography ==
Lectures on Buildings, original edition, Academic Press 1989; paperback edition, updated and revised, University of Chicago Press 2009.

Symmetry and the Monster, Oxford University Press 2006. ISBN 978-0-19-280723-6
