= Janko group J2 =

Sporadic simple group

In the area of modern algebra known as group theory, the Janko group J_{2} or the Hall-Janko group HJ is a sporadic simple group of order

604,800 = 2^{7} · 3^{3} · 5^{2} · 7
≈ 6×10^{5}.

== History and properties ==
J_{2} is one of the 26 sporadic groups and is also called Hall–Janko–Wales group. In 1969 Zvonimir Janko predicted J_{2} as one of two new simple groups having 2^{1+4}:A_{5} as a centralizer of an involution (the other is the Janko group J3). It was constructed by Marshall Hall and David Wales (1968) as a rank 3 permutation group on 100 points.

Both the Schur multiplier and the outer automorphism group have order 2. As a permutation group on 100 points J_{2} has involutions moving all 100 points and involutions moving just 80 points. The former involutions are products of 25 double transportions, an odd number, and hence lift to 4-elements in the double cover 2.A_{100}. The double cover 2.J_{2} occurs as a subgroup of the Conway group Co_{0}.

J_{2} is the only one of the 4 Janko groups that is a subquotient of the monster group; it is thus part of what Robert Griess calls the Happy Family. Since it is also found in the Conway group Co1, it is therefore part of the second generation of the Happy Family.

== Representations ==
It is a subgroup of index two of the group of automorphisms of the Hall–Janko graph, leading to a permutation representation of degree 100. It is also a subgroup of index two of the group of automorphisms of the Hall–Janko Near Octagon, leading to a permutation representation of degree 315.

It has a modular representation of dimension six over the field of four elements; if in characteristic two we have w^{2} + w + 1 = 0, then J_{2} is generated by the two matrices

$${\mathbf A} = \begin{pmatrix}
w^2 & w^2 &   0 &   0 &   0 & 0 \\
1 & w^2 &   0 &   0 &   0 & 0 \\
1 &   1 & w^2 & w^2 &   0 & 0 \\
w &   1 &   1 & w^2 &   0 & 0 \\
0 & w^2 & w^2 & w^2 &   0 & w \\
w^2 &   1 & w^2 &   0 & w^2 & 0
\end{pmatrix}$$

and

$${\mathbf B} = \begin{pmatrix}
w & 1 & w^2 &   1 & w^2 & w^2 \\
w & 1 &   w &   1 &   1 & w \\
w & w & w^2 & w^2 &   1 & 0 \\
0 & 0 &   0 &   0 &   1 & 1 \\
w^2 & 1 & w^2 & w^2 &   w & w^2 \\
w^2 & 1 & w^2 &   w & w^2 & w
\end{pmatrix}.$$

These matrices satisfy the equations

$${\mathbf A}^2 = {\mathbf B}^3 = ({\mathbf A}{\mathbf B})^7 =
({\mathbf A}{\mathbf B}{\mathbf A}{\mathbf B}{\mathbf B})^{12} = 1.$$

(Note that matrix multiplication on a finite field of order 4 is defined slightly differently from ordinary matrix multiplication. See Finite field § Field with four elements for the specific addition and multiplication tables, with w the same as a and w^{2} the same as 1 + a.)

J_{2} is thus a Hurwitz group, a finite homomorphic image of the (2,3,7) triangle group.

The matrix representation given above constitutes an embedding into Dickson's group G_{2}(4). There is only one conjugacy class of J_{2} in G_{2}(4). Every subgroup J_{2} contained in G_{2}(4) extends to a subgroup J_{2}:2 = Aut(J_{2}) in G_{2}(4):2 = Aut(G_{2}(4)) (G_{2}(4) extended by the field automorphisms of F_{4}). G_{2}(4) is in turn isomorphic to a subgroup of the Conway group Co_{1}.

== Maximal subgroups ==
There are 9 conjugacy classes of maximal subgroups of J_{2}. Some are here described in terms of action on the Hall–Janko graph.

Maximal subgroups of J_{2}
| No. | Structure | Order | Index | Comments |
|---|---|---|---|---|
| 1 | U_{3}(3) | 6,048 = 2^{5}·3^{3}·7 | 100 = 2^{2}·5^{2} | one-point stabilizer, with orbits of sizes 1, 36, and 63; simple, containing 36 simple subgroups of order 168 and 63 involutions, all conjugate, each moving 80 points. A given involution is found in 12 168-subgroups, thus fixes them under conjugacy. Its centralizer has structure 4.S_{4}, which contains 6 additional involutions. |
| 2 | 3.PGL_{2}(9) | 2,160 = 2^{4}·3^{3}·5 | 280 = 2^{3}·5·7 | normalizer of a subgroup of order 3 (class 3A); has a subquotient A_{6} |
| 3 | 2^{1+4}_{–}:A_{5} | 1,920 = 2^{7}·3·5 | 315 = 3^{2}·5·7 | centralizer of involution of class 2A moving 80 points |
| 4 | 2^{2+4}:(3 × S_{3}) | 1,152 = 2^{7}·3^{2} | 525 = 3·5^{2}·7 | |
| 5 | A_{4} × A_{5} | 720 = 2^{4}·3^{2}·5 | 840 = 2^{3}·3·5·7 | contains 2^{2} × A_{5} (of order 240), centralizer of 3 involutions each moving 100 points |
| 6 | A_{5} × D_{10} | 600 = 2^{3}·3·5^{2} | 1,008 = 2^{4}·3^{2}·7 | normalizer of a subgroup of order 5 (classes 5A, 5B) |
| 7 | PGL_{2}(7) | 336 = 2^{4}·3·7 | 1,800 = 2^{3}·3^{2}·5^{2} | |
| 8 | 5^{2}:D_{12} | 300 = 2^{2}·3·5^{2} | 2,016 = 2^{5}·3^{2}·7 | |
| 9 | A_{5} | 60 = 2^{2}·3·5 | 10,080 = 2^{5}·3^{2}·5·7 | |

== Conjugacy classes ==
The maximum order of any element is 15. As permutations, elements act on the 100 vertices of the Hall–Janko graph.

| Order | No. elements | Cycle structure and conjugacy |
|---|---|---|
| 1 = 1 | 1 = 1 | 1 class |
| 2 = 2 | 315 = 3^{2} · 5 · 7 | 2^{40}, 1 class |
| 2 = 2 | 2520 = 2^{3} · 3^{2} · 5 · 7 | 2^{50}, 1 class |
| 3 = 3 | 560 = 2^{4} · 5 · 7 | 3^{30}, 1 class |
| 3 = 3 | 16800 = 2^{5} · 3 · 5^{2} · 7 | 3^{32}, 1 class |
| 4 = 2^{2} | 6300 = 2^{2} · 3^{2} · 5^{2} · 7 | 2^{6}4^{20}, 1 class |
| 5 = 5 | 4032 = 2^{6} · 3^{2} · 7 | 5^{20}, 2 classes, power equivalent |
| 5 = 5 | 24192 = 2^{7} · 3^{3} · 7 | 5^{20}, 2 classes, power equivalent |
| 6 = 2 · 3 | 25200 = 2^{4} · 3^{2} · 5^{2} · 7 | 2^{4}3^{6}6^{12}, 1 class |
| 6 = 2 · 3 | 50400 = 2^{5} · 3^{2} · 5^{2} · 7 | 2^{2}6^{16}, 1 class |
| 7 = 7 | 86400 = 2^{7} · 3^{3} · 5^{2} | 7^{14}, 1 class |
| 8 = 2^{3} | 75600 = 2^{4} · 3^{3} · 5^{2} · 7 | 2^{3}4^{3}8^{10}, 1 class |
| 10 = 2 · 5 | 60480 = 2^{6} · 3^{3} · 5 · 7 | 10^{10}, 2 classes, power equivalent |
| 10 = 2 · 5 | 120960 = 2^{7} · 3^{3} · 5 · 7 | 5^{4}10^{8}, 2 classes, power equivalent |
| 12 = 2^{2} · 3 | 50400 = 2^{5} · 3^{2} · 5^{2} · 7 | 3^{2}4^{2}6^{2}12^{6}, 1 class |
| 15 = 3 · 5 | 80640 = 2^{8} · 3^{2} · 5 · 7 | 5^{2}15^{6}, 2 classes, power equivalent |
