= Janko group J4 =

Sporadic simple group

In the area of modern algebra known as group theory, the Janko group J_{4} is a sporadic simple group of order

86,775,571,046,077,562,880
= 2^{21} · 3^{3} · 5 · 7 · 11^{3} · 23 · 29 · 31 · 37 · 43
≈ 9×10^{19}.

== History ==
J_{4} is one of the 26 Sporadic groups. Zvonimir Janko found J_{4} in 1975 by studying groups with an involution centralizer of the form 2^{1 + 12}.3.(M_{22}:2). Its existence and uniqueness was shown using computer calculations by Simon P. Norton and others in 1980. It has a modular representation of dimension 112 over the finite field with 2 elements and is the stabilizer of a certain 4995 dimensional subspace of the exterior square, a fact which Norton used to construct it, and which is the easiest way to deal with it computationally. Aschbacher & Segev (1991) and Ivanov (1992) gave computer-free proofs of uniqueness. Ivanov & Meierfrankenfeld (1999) and Ivanov (2004) gave a computer-free proof of existence by constructing it as an amalgams of groups 2^{11}:M_{24}, 2^{10}:L_{5}(2), and 2^{3+12}.(L_{3}(2)xS_{5}) over their intersections.

The Schur multiplier and the outer automorphism group are both trivial.

Since 37 and 43 are not supersingular primes, J_{4} cannot be a subquotient of the monster group. Thus it is one of the 6 sporadic groups called the pariahs.

== Representations ==
The smallest faithful complex representation has dimension 1333; there are two complex conjugate representations of this dimension. The smallest faithful representation over any field is a 112 dimensional representation over the field of 2 elements.

The smallest permutation representation is on 173067389=11^{2} · 29 · 31 · 37 · 43 points, with point stabilizer of the form 2^{11}:M_{24}. This permutation representation has rank 7; the suborbit lengths are 1, 15180=2^{2} · 3 · 5 · 11 · 23, 28336=2^{4} · 7 · 11 · 23, 3400320=2^{7} · 3 · 5 · 7 · 11 · 23, 32643072=2^{11} · 3^{2} · 7 · 11 · 23, 54405120=2^{11} · 3 · 5 · 7 · 11 · 23, and 82575360=2^{18} · 3^{2} · 7. The points can be identified with certain "special vectors" in the 112 dimensional representation.

The degrees of irreducible representations of the Janko group J_{4} are 1, 1333, 1333, 299367, 299367, ... (sequence A003907 in the OEIS).

== Presentation ==
It has a presentation in terms of three generators a, b, and c as

$$\begin{align}
a^2 &=b^3=c^2=(ab)^{23}=[a,b]^{12}=[a,bab]^5=[c,a]= \left ((ab)^2ab^{-1} \right)^3 \left (ab(ab^{-1})^2 \right)^3=\left (ab \left (abab^{-1} \right )^3 \right )^4 \\
&=\left [c,(ba)^2 b^{-1}ab^{-1} (ab)^3 \right]= \left (bc^{(bab^{-1}a)^2} \right )^3= \left ((bababab)^3 c c^{(ab)^3b(ab)^6b} \right )^2=1.
\end{align}$$

Alternatively, one can start with the subgroup M_{24} and adjoin 3975 involutions, which are identified with the trios. By adding a certain relation, certain products of commuting involutions generate the binary Golay code, which extends to the maximal subgroup 2^{11}:M_{24}. Bolt, Bray, and Curtis showed, using a computer, that adding just one more relation is sufficient to define J_{4}.

== Maximal subgroups ==
Kleidman & Wilson (1988) found the 13 conjugacy classes of maximal subgroups of J_{4} which are listed in the table below.

Maximal subgroups of J_{4}
No.	Structure	Order	Index	Comments
1	2^{11}:M_{24}	501,397,585,920 = 2^{21}·3^{3}·5·7·11·23	173,067,389 = 11^{2}·29·31·37·43	contains a Sylow 2-subgroup and a Sylow 3-subgroup; contains the centralizer 2^{11}:(M_{22}:2) of involution of class 2B
2	2^{1+12}_{+}^{·}3.(M_{22}:2)	21,799,895,040 = 2^{21}·3^{3}·5·7·11	3,980,549,947 = 11^{2}·23·29·31·37·43	centralizer of involution of class 2A; contains a Sylow 2-subgroup and a Sylow 3-subgroup
3	2^{10}:L_{5}(2)	10,239,344,640 = 2^{20}·3^{2}·5·7·31	8,474,719,242 = 2·3·11^{3}·23·29·37·43	
4	2^{3+12 ·}(S_{5} × L_{3}(2))	660,602,880 = 2^{21}·3^{2}·5·7	131,358,148,251 = 3·11^{3}·23·29·31·37·43	contains a Sylow 2-subgroup
5	U_{3}(11):2	141,831,360 = 2^{6}·3^{2}·5·11^{3}·37	611,822,174,208 = 2^{15}·3·7·23·29·31·43	
6	M_{22}:2	887,040 = 2^{8}·3^{2}·5·7·11	97,825,995,497,472 = 2^{13}·3·11^{2}·23·29·31·37·43	
7	11^{1+2}_{+}:(5 × GL(2,3))	319,440 = 2^{4}·3·5·11^{3}	271,649,045,348,352 = 2^{17}·3^{2}·7·23·29·31·37·43	normalizer of a Sylow 11-subgroup
8	L_{2}(32):5	163,680 = 2^{5}·3·5·11·31	530,153,782,050,816 = 2^{16}·3^{2}·7·11^{2}·23·29·37·43	
9	PGL(2,23)	12,144 = 2^{4}·3·11·23	7,145,550,975,467,520 = 2^{17}·3^{2}·5·7·11^{2}·29·31·37·43	
10	U_{3}(3)	6,048 = 2^{5}·3^{3}·7	14,347,812,672,962,560 = 2^{16}·5·11^{3}·23·29·31·37·43	contains a Sylow 3-subgroup
11	29:28	812 = 2^{2}·7·29	106,866,466,805,514,240 = 2^{19}·3^{3}·5·11^{3}·23·31·37·43	Frobenius group; normalizer of a Sylow 29-subgroup
12	43:14	602 = 2·7·43	144,145,466,853,949,440 = 2^{20}·3^{3}·5·11^{3}·23·29·31·37	Frobenius group; normalizer of a Sylow 43-subgroup
13	37:12	444 = 2^{2}·3·37	195,440,475,329,003,520 = 2^{19}·3^{2}·5·7·11^{3}·23·29·31·43	Frobenius group; normalizer of a Sylow 37-subgroup

A Sylow 3-subgroup of J_{4} is a Heisenberg group: order 27, non-abelian, all non-trivial elements of order 3.
