= Mathieu group M11 =

Sporadic simple group

In the area of modern algebra known as group theory, the Mathieu group M_{11} is a sporadic simple group of order

7,920 = 11 · 10 · 9 · 8 = 2^{4} · 3^{2} · 5 · 11.

== History and properties ==
M_{11} is one of the 26 sporadic groups and was introduced by Mathieu (1861, 1873). It is the smallest sporadic group and, along with the other four Mathieu groups, the first to be discovered. The Schur multiplier and the outer automorphism group are both trivial.

M_{11} is a sharply 4-transitive permutation group on 11 objects. It admits many generating sets of permutations, such as the pair (1,2,3,4,5,6,7,8,9,10,11), (3,7,11,8)(4,10,5,6) of permutations used by the GAP computer algebra system.

== Representations ==
M_{11} has a sharply 4-transitive permutation representation on 11 points. The point stabilizer is sometimes denoted by M_{10}, and is a non-split extension of the form A_{6}.2 (an extension of the group of order 2 by the alternating group A_{6}). This action is the automorphism group of a Steiner system S(4,5,11). The induced action on unordered pairs of points gives a rank 3 action on 55 points.

M_{11} has a 3-transitive permutation representation on 12 points with point stabilizer PSL_{2}(11). The permutation representations on 11 and 12 points can both be seen inside the Mathieu group M_{12} as two different embeddings of M_{11} in M_{12}, exchanged by an outer automorphism.

The permutation representation on 11 points gives a complex irreducible representation in 10 dimensions. This is the smallest possible dimension of a faithful complex representation, though there are also two other such representations in 10 dimensions forming a complex conjugate pair.

M_{11} has two 5-dimensional irreducible representations over the field with 3 elements, related to the restrictions of 6-dimensional representations of the double cover of M_{12}. These have the smallest dimension of any faithful linear representations of M_{11} over any field.

== Maximal subgroups ==
There are 5 conjugacy classes of maximal subgroups of M_{11} as follows:

Maximal subgroups of M_{11}
No.	Structure	Order	Index	Comments
1	M_{10} ≅ A_{6}^{·}2	720 = 2^{4}·3^{2}·5	11	one-point stabilizer in representation of degree 11
2	L_{2}(11)	660 = 2^{2}·3·5·11	12 = 2^{2}·3	one-point stabilizer in representation of degree 12
3	M_{9}:2 ≅ 3_{2}:Q_{8}.2	144 = 2^{4}·3^{2}	55 = 5·11	stabilizer of a 9 and 2 partition
4	S_{5}	120 = 2^{3}·3·5	66 = 2·3·11	has orbits of sizes 5 and 6; stabilizer of block in the S(4,5,11) Steiner system
5	Q_{8}:S_{3} ≅ GL_{2}(3)	48 = 2^{4}·3	165 = 3·5·11	has orbits of sizes 8 and 3; centralizer of a quadruple transposition

== Conjugacy classes ==
The maximum order of any element in M_{11} is 11. Cycle structures are shown for the representations both of degree 11 and 12.

Order	No. elements	Degree 11	Degree 12	
1 = 1	1 = 1	1^{11}·	1^{12}·	
2 = 2	165 = 3 · 5 · 11	1^{3}·2^{4}	1^{4}·2^{4}	
3 = 3	440 = 2^{3} · 5 · 11	1^{2}·3^{3}	1^{3}·3^{3}	
4 = 2^{2}	990 = 2 · 3^{2} · 5 · 11	1^{3}·4^{2}	2^{2}·4^{2}	
5 = 5	1584 = 2^{4} · 3^{2} · 11	1·5^{2}	1^{2}·5^{2}	
6 = 2 · 3	1320 = 2^{3} · 3 · 5 · 11	2·3·6	1·2·3·6	
8 = 2^{3}	990 = 2 · 3^{2} · 5 · 11	1·2·8	4·8	power equivalent
8 = 2^{3}	990 = 2 · 3^{2} · 5 · 11	1·2·8	4·8	power equivalent
11 = 11	720 = 2^{4} · 3^{2} · 5	11	1·11	power equivalent
11 = 11	720 = 2^{4} · 3^{2} · 5	11	1·11	power equivalent
