= Held group =

Sporadic simple group

In the area of modern algebra known as group theory, the Held group (He) is a sporadic simple group of order

4,030,387,200 = 2^{10} · 3^{3} · 5^{2} · 7^{3} · 17
≈ 4×10^{9}.

== History ==
He is one of the 26 sporadic groups and was found by Dieter Held (1969a, 1969b) during an investigation of simple groups containing an involution whose centralizer is an extension of the extra special group 2^{1+6} by the linear group L_{3}(2), which is the same involution centralizer as the Mathieu group M_{24}. A second such group is the linear group L_{5}(2). The Held group is the third possibility, and its construction was completed by John McKay and Graham Higman. In all of these groups, the extension splits.

The outer automorphism group has order 2 and the Schur multiplier is trivial.

== Representations ==
The smallest faithful complex representation has dimension 51; there are two such representations that are duals of each other.

It centralizes an element of order 7 in the Monster group. As a result the prime 7 plays a special role in the theory of the group; for example, the smallest representation of the Held group over any field is the 50-dimensional representation over the field with 7 elements, and it acts naturally on a vertex operator algebra over the field with 7 elements.

The smallest permutation representation is a rank 5 action on 2058 points with point stabilizer Sp_{4}(4):2. The graph associated with this representation has rank 5 and is directed; the outer automorphism reverses the direction of the edges, decreasing the rank to 4.

Since He is the normalizer of a Frobenius group 7:3 in the Monster group, it does not just commute with a 7-cycle, but also some 3-cycles. Each of these 3-cycles is normalized by the Fischer group Fi_{24}, so He:2 is a subgroup of the derived subgroup Fi_{24}' (the non-simple group Fi_{24} has 2 conjugacy classes of He:2, which are fused by an outer automorphism). As mentioned above, the smallest permutation representation of He has 2058 points, and when realized inside Fi_{24}', there is an orbit of 2058 transpositions.

== Generalized monstrous moonshine ==
Conway and Norton suggested in their 1979 paper that monstrous moonshine is not limited to the monster, but that similar phenomena may be found for other groups. Larissa Queen and others subsequently found that one can construct the expansions of many Hauptmoduln from simple combinations of dimensions of sporadic groups. For He, the relevant McKay-Thompson series is $T_{7A}(\tau)$ where one can set the constant term a(0) = 10 (OEIS: A007264),

$$\begin{align}
j_{7A}(\tau)
&= T_{7A}(\tau)+10\\
&= \left(\left(\tfrac{\eta(\tau)}{\eta(7\tau)}\right)^{2} + 7\left(\tfrac{\eta(7\tau)}{\eta(\tau)}\right)^2\right)^2\\
&= \frac{1}{q} + 10 + 51q + 204q^2 + 681q^3 + 1956q^4 + 5135q^5 + \dots
\end{align}$$

and η(τ) is the Dedekind eta function.

== Presentation ==
It can be defined in terms of the generators a and b and relations

$$a^2 = b^7 = (ab)^{17} = [a, b]^6 = \left [a, b^3 \right ]^5 = \left [a, babab^{-1}abab \right ] = (ab)^4 ab^2 ab^{-3} ababab^{-1}ab^3 ab^{-2}ab^2 = 1.$$

== Maximal subgroups ==
Butler (1981) found the 11 conjugacy classes of maximal subgroups of He as follows:

Maximal subgroups of He
No.	Structure	Order	Index	Comments
1	S_{4}(4):2	1,958,400 = 2^{9}·3^{2}·5^{2}·17	2,058 = 2·3·7^{3}	
2	2^{2}.L_{3}(4).S_{3}	483,840 = 2^{9}·3^{3}·5·7	8,330 = 2·5·7^{2}·17	
3,4	2^{6}:3^{·}S_{6}	138,240 = 2^{10}·3^{3}·5	29,155 = 5·7^{3}·17	two classes, fused by an outer automorphism
5	2^{1+6}_{+}:L_{3}(2)	21,504 = 2^{10}·3·7	187,425 = 3^{2}·5^{2}·7^{2}·17	centralizer of an involution of class 2B
6	7^{2}:2.L_{2}(7)	16,464 = 2^{4}·3·7^{3}	244,800 = 2^{6}·3^{2}·5^{2}·17	
7	3.S_{7}	15,120 = 2^{4}·3^{3}·5·7	266,560 = 2^{6}·5·7^{2}·17	normalizer of a subgroup of order 3 (class 3A); centralizer of an outer automorphism of order 2
8	7^{1+2}_{+}:(3 × S_{3})	6,174 = 2·3^{2}·7^{3}	652,800 = 2^{9}·3·5^{2}·17	normalizer of a subgroup of order 7 (class 7C)
9	S_{4} × L_{3}(2)	4,032 = 2^{6}·3^{2}·7	999,600 = 2^{4}·3·5^{2}·7^{2}·17	
10	7:3 × L_{3}(2)	3,528 = 2^{3}·3^{2}·7^{2}	1,142,400 = 2^{7}·3·5^{2}·7·17	
11	5^{2}:4A_{4}	1,200 = 2^{4}·3·5^{2}	3,358,656 = 2^{6}·3^{2}·7^{3}·17	
