= Monster group =

Sporadic simple group

In the area of abstract algebra known as group theory, the monster group M (also known as the Fischer–Griess monster, the friendly giant, or simply the Monster) is the largest sporadic simple group; it has order

808017424794512875886459904961710757005754368000000000

= 2^{46} · 3^{20} · 5^{9} · 7^{6} · 11^{2} · 13^{3} · 17 · 19 · 23 · 29 · 31 · 41 · 47 · 59 · 71 = 32! · 10! · ( 4! )^{2} · 2 · 7 · 13 · 41 · 47 · 59 · 71

≈ 8.0802 × 10^{53} .

The finite simple groups have been completely classified. Every such group belongs to one of 18 countably infinite families or is one of 26 sporadic groups that do not follow such a systematic pattern. The monster group contains 20 sporadic groups (including itself) as subquotients. Robert Griess, who proved the existence of the monster in 1982, has called those 20 groups the happy family, and the remaining six exceptions pariahs.

It is difficult to give a good constructive definition of the monster because of its complexity. Martin Gardner wrote a popular account of the monster group in his June 1980 Mathematical Games column in Scientific American.

== History ==
The monster was predicted by Bernd Fischer (unpublished, about 1973) and Robert Griess as a simple group containing a double cover of Fischer's baby monster group as a centralizer of an involution. Within a few months, the order of M was found by Griess using the Thompson order formula, and Fischer, Conway, Norton and Thompson discovered other groups as subquotients, including many of the known sporadic groups, and two new ones: the Thompson group and the Harada–Norton group. The character table of the monster, a 194 × 194 array, was calculated in 1979 by Fischer and Donald Livingstone using computer programs written by Michael Thorne. It was not clear in the 1970s whether the monster actually existed. Griess constructed M as the automorphism group of the Griess algebra, a 196883 dimensional commutative nonassociative algebra over the real numbers; he first announced his construction in Ann Arbor on 14 January 1980. In his 1982 paper, he referred to the monster as the "Friendly Giant", but this name has not been generally adopted. John Conway and Jacques Tits subsequently simplified this construction.

Griess's construction showed that the monster exists. Thompson showed that its uniqueness (as a simple group satisfying certain conditions coming from the classification of finite simple groups) would follow from the existence of a 196883 dimensional faithful representation. A proof of the existence of such a representation was announced by Norton, though he never published the details. Griess, Meierfrankenfeld, and Segev gave the first complete published proof of the uniqueness of the monster (more precisely, they showed that a group with the same centralizers of involutions as the monster is isomorphic to the monster).

The monster was a culmination of the development of sporadic simple groups and can be built from any two of three subquotients: The Fischer group Fi_{24}, the baby monster, and the Conway group Co_{1}.

The Schur multiplier and the outer automorphism group of the monster are both trivial.

== Representations ==
The minimal degree of a faithful complex representation is 47 × 59 × 71 = 196883 , which is the product of the three largest prime divisors of the order of M. The smallest faithful linear representation over any field has dimension 196882 over the field with two elements, only one less than the dimension of the smallest faithful complex representation.

The smallest faithful permutation representation of the monster is on

97239461142009186000
= 2^{4} · 3^{7} · 5^{3} · 7^{4} · 11 · 13^{2} · 29 · 41 · 59 · 71 ≈ 10^{20}

points.

The monster can be realized as a Galois group over the rational numbers, and as a Hurwitz group.

The monster is unusual among simple groups in that there is no known easy way to represent its elements. This is not due so much to its size as to the absence of "small" representations. For example, the simple groups A_{100} and SL_{20}(2) are far larger but easy to calculate with as they have "small" permutation or linear representations. Alternating groups, such as A_{100}, have permutation representations that are "small" compared to the size of the group, and all finite simple groups of Lie type, such as SL_{20}(2), have linear representations that are "small" compared to the size of the group. All sporadic groups other than the monster also have linear representations small enough that they are easy to work with on a computer (the next hardest case after the monster is the baby monster, with a representation of dimension 4370).

=== Computer construction ===
Martin Seysen (2022) implemented a fast Python package named mmgroup, which claims to be the first implementation of the monster group where arbitrary operations can effectively be performed. The documentation states that multiplication of group elements takes less than 40 milliseconds on a typical modern PC, which is five orders of magnitude faster than estimated by Robert A. Wilson in 2013. The mmgroup software package has been used to find two new maximal subgroups of the monster group.

Previously, R. A. Wilson had found explicitly (with the aid of a computer) two invertible 196,882 by 196,882 matrices (with elements in the field of order 2) which together generate the monster group by matrix multiplication; this is one dimension lower than the 196883 dimensional representation in characteristic 0. Performing calculations with these matrices was possible but is too expensive in terms of time and storage space to be useful, as each such matrix occupies over four and a half gigabytes.

Wilson asserts that the best description of the monster is to say,

"It is the automorphism group of the monster vertex algebra".

This is not much help however, because nobody has found a "really simple and natural construction of the monster vertex algebra".

Wilson with collaborators found a method of performing calculations with the monster that was considerably faster, although now superseded by Seysen's abovementioned work. Let V be a 196,882 dimensional vector space over the field with 2 elements. A large subgroup H (preferably a maximal subgroup) of the Monster is selected in which it is easy to perform calculations. The subgroup H chosen is 3^{1+12}.2.Suz.2, where Suz is the Suzuki group. Elements of the monster are stored as words in the elements of H and an extra generator T. It is reasonably quick to calculate the action of one of these words on a vector in V. Using this action, it is possible to perform calculations (such as the order of an element of the monster). Wilson has exhibited vectors u and v whose joint stabilizer is the trivial group. Thus (for example) one can calculate the order of an element g of the monster by finding the smallest k > 0 such that g^{k} u = u and g^{k} v = v . This and similar constructions (in different characteristics) were used to find some of the non-local maximal subgroups of the monster group.

== Subquotients ==
Diagram of the 26 sporadic simple groups, showing subquotient relationships.

The monster contains 20 of the 26 sporadic groups as subquotients. This diagram, based on one in the book Symmetry and the Monster by Mark Ronan, shows how they fit together. The lines signify inclusion, as a subquotient, of the lower group by the upper one. The circled symbols denote groups not involved in larger sporadic groups. For the sake of clarity redundant inclusions are not shown.

== Maximal subgroups ==
The monster has 46 conjugacy classes of maximal subgroups. Non-abelian simple groups of some 60 isomorphism types are found as subgroups or as quotients of subgroups. The largest alternating group represented is A_{12}.

The 46 classes of maximal subgroups of the monster are given by the following table. Previous unpublished work of Wilson et al. had purported to rule out any almost simple subgroups with non-abelian simple socles of the form U_{3}(4), L_{2}(8), and L_{2}(16). However, the latter was contradicted by Dietrich et al., who found a new maximal subgroup of the form U_{3}(4). The same authors had previously found a new maximal subgroup of the form L_{2}(13) and confirmed that there are no maximal subgroups with socle L_{2}(8) or L_{2}(16), thus completing the classification in the literature.

Maximal subgroups of the Monster
Nr.	Structure	Order	Comments
1	2^{·}B	8,309,562,962,452,852,382,355,161,088 ×1,000,000 = 2^{42}·3^{13}·5^{6}·7^{2}·11·13·17·19·23·31·47	centralizer of an involution of class 2A; contains the normalizer (47:23) × 2 of a Sylow 47 subgroup
2	2^{1+24}_{+}^{·}Co_{1}	139,511,839,126,336,328,171,520,000 = 2^{46}·3^{9}·5^{4}·7^{2}·11·13·23	centralizer of an involution of class 2B
3	3^{·}Fi_{24}	7,531,234,255,143,970,327,756,800 = 2^{22}·3^{17}·5^{2}·7^{3}·11·13·17·23·29	normalizer of a subgroup of order 3 (class 3A); contains the normalizer ((29:14) × 3).2 of a Sylow 29 subgroup
4	2^{2 · 2}E_{6}(2):S_{3}	1,836,779,512,410,596,494,540,800 = 2^{39}·3^{10}·5^{2}·7^{2}·11·13·17·19	normalizer of a Klein 4 group of type 2A^{2}
5	2^{10+16 ·}O^{+}_{10}(2)	1,577,011,055,923,770,163,200 = 2^{46}·3^{5}·5^{2}·7·17·31	
6	2^{2+11+22}.(S_{3} × M_{24})	50,472,333,605,150,392,320 = 2^{46}·3^{4}·5·7·11·23	normalizer of a Klein 4-group; contains the normalizer (23:11) × S_{4} of a Sylow 23 subgroup
7	3^{1+12}_{+}.2Suz.2	2,859,230,155,080,499,200 = 2^{15}·3^{20}·5^{2}·7·11·13	normalizer of a subgroup of order 3 (class 3B)
8	2^{5+10+20}.(S_{3} × L_{5}(2))	2,061,452,360,684,666,880 = 2^{46}·3^{3}·5·7·31	
9	S_{3} × Th	544,475,663,327,232,000 = 2^{16}·3^{11}·5^{3}·7^{2}·13·19·31	normalizer of a subgroup of order 3 (class 3C); contains the normalizer (31:15) × S_{3} of a Sylow 31 subgroup
10	2^{3+6+12+18}.(L_{3}(2) × 3S_{6})	199,495,389,743,677,440 = 2^{46}·3^{4}·5·7	
11	3^{8 ·}O^{−}_{8}(3)^{·}2_{3}	133,214,132,225,341,440 = 2^{11}·3^{20}·5·7·13·41	
12	(D_{10} × HN).2	5,460,618,240,000,000 = 2^{16}·3^{6}·5^{7}·7·11·19	normalizer of a subgroup of order 5 (class 5A)
13	(3^{2}:2 × O^{+}_{8}(3)).S_{4}	2,139,341,679,820,800 = 2^{16}·3^{15}·5^{2}·7·13	
14	3^{2+5+10}.(M_{11} × 2S_{4})	49,093,924,366,080 = 2^{8}·3^{20}·5·11	
15	3^{3+2+6+6}:(L_{3}(3) × SD_{16})	11,604,018,486,528 = 2^{8}·3^{20}·13	
16	5^{1+6}_{+}:2J_{2}:4	378,000,000,000 = 2^{10}·3^{3}·5^{9}·7	normalizer of a subgroup of order 5 (class 5B)
17	(7:3 × He):2	169,276,262,400 = 2^{11}·3^{4}·5^{2}·7^{4}·17	normalizer of a subgroup of order 7 (class 7A)
18	(A_{5} × A_{12}):2	28,740,096,000 = 2^{12}·3^{6}·5^{3}·7·11	
19	5^{3+3}.(2 × L_{3}(5))	11,625,000,000 = 2^{6}·3·5^{9}·31	
20	(A_{6} × A_{6} × A_{6}).(2 × S_{4})	2,239,488,000 = 2^{13}·3^{7}·5^{3}	
21	(A_{5} × U_{3}(8):3_{1}):2	1,985,679,360 = 2^{12}·3^{6}·5·7·19	contains the normalizer ((19:9) × A_{5}):2 of a Sylow 19 subgroup
22	5^{2+2+4}:(S_{3} × GL_{2}(5))	1,125,000,000 = 2^{6}·3^{2}·5^{9}	
23	(L_{3}(2) × S_{4}(4):2).2	658,022,400 = 2^{13}·3^{3}·5^{2}·7·17	contains the normalizer ((17:8) × L_{3}(2)).2 of a Sylow 17 subgroup
24	7^{1+4}_{+}:(3 × 2S_{7})	508,243,680 = 2^{5}·3^{3}·5·7^{6}	normalizer of a subgroup of order 7 (class 7B)
25	(5^{2}:4.2^{2} × U_{3}(5)).S_{3}	302,400,000 = 2^{9}·3^{3}·5^{5}·7	
26	(L_{2}(11) × M_{12}):2	125,452,800 = 2^{9}·3^{4}·5^{2}·11^{2}	contains the normalizer (11:5 × M_{12}):2 of a subgroup of order 11
27	(A_{7} × (A_{5} × A_{5}):2^{2}):2	72,576,000 = 2^{10}·3^{4}·5^{3}·7	
28	5^{4}:(3 × 2L_{2}(25)):2_{2}	58,500,000 = 2^{5}·3^{2}·5^{6}·13	
29	7^{2+1+2}:GL_{2}(7)	33,882,912 = 2^{5}·3^{2}·7^{6}	
30	M_{11} × A_{6}.2^{2}	11,404,800 = 2^{9}·3^{4}·5^{2}·11	
31	(S_{5} × S_{5} × S_{5}):S_{3}	10,368,000 = 2^{10}·3^{4}·5^{3}	
32	(L_{2}(11) × L_{2}(11)):4	1,742,400 = 2^{6}·3^{2}·5^{2}·11^{2}	
33	13^{2}:2L_{2}(13).4	1,476,384 = 2^{5}·3·7·13^{3}	
34	(7^{2}:(3 × 2A_{4}) × L_{2}(7)):2	1,185,408 = 2^{7}·3^{3}·7^{3}	
35	(13:6 × L_{3}(3)).2	876,096 = 2^{6}·3^{4}·13^{2}	normalizer of a subgroup of order 13 (class 13A)
36	13^{1+2}_{+}:(3 × 4S_{4})	632,736 = 2^{5}·3^{2}·13^{3}	normalizer of a subgroup of order 13 (class 13B); normalizer of a Sylow 13 subgroup
37	U_{3}(4):4	249,600 = 2^{8}·3·5^{2}·13	
38	L_{2}(71)	178,920 = 2^{3}·3^{2}·5·7·71	contains the normalizer 71:35 of a Sylow 71 subgroup
39	11^{2}:(5 × 2A_{5})	72,600 = 2^{3}·3·5^{2}·11^{2}	normalizer of a Sylow 11 subgroup.
40	L_{2}(41)	34,440 = 2^{3}·3·5·7·41	Norton and Wilson found a maximal subgroup of this form; due to a subtle error pointed out by Zavarnitsine, some previous lists and papers claimed that no such maximal subgroup existed
41	L_{2}(29):2	24,360 = 2^{3}·3·5·7·29	
42	7^{2}:SL_{2}(7)	16,464 =2^{4}·3·7^{3}	this was accidentally omitted from some previous lists of 7 local subgroups
43	L_{2}(19):2	6,840 = 2^{3}·3^{2}·5·19	
44	L_{2}(13):2	2,184 = 2^{3}·3·7·13	
45	59:29	1,711 = 29·59	normalizer of a Sylow 59 subgroup; previously thought to be L_{2}(59)
46	41:40	1,640 = 2^{3}·5·41	normalizer of a Sylow 41 subgroup

Note that tables of maximal subgroups have often been found to contain subtle errors, and in particular at least two of the subgroups in this table were incorrectly omitted from some previous lists.

== McKay's E_{8} observation ==
There are also connections between the monster and the extended Dynkin diagrams $\ \tilde{E}_8\$ specifically between the nodes of the diagram and certain conjugacy classes in the monster, known as McKay's E_{8} observation. This is then extended to a relation between the extended diagrams $\ \tilde{E}_6, \tilde{E}_7, \tilde{E}_8\$ and the groups 3.Fi_{24}′, 2.B, and M, where these are (3/2/1-fold central extensions) of the Fischer group, baby monster group, and monster. These are the sporadic groups associated with centralizers of elements of type 1A, 2A, and 3A in the monster, and the order of the extension corresponds to the symmetries of the diagram. See ADE classification: trinities for further connections (of McKay correspondence type), including (for the monster) with the rather small simple group PSL(2,11) and with the 120 tritangent planes of a canonic sextic curve of genus 4 known as Bring's curve.

== Moonshine ==
The monster group is one of two principal constituents in the monstrous moonshine conjecture by Conway and Norton, which relates discrete and non-discrete mathematics and was finally proved by Richard Borcherds in 1992.

In this setting, the monster group is visible as the automorphism group of the monster module, a vertex operator algebra, an infinite dimensional algebra containing the Griess algebra, and acts on the monster Lie algebra, a generalized Kac–Moody algebra.

Many mathematicians, including Conway, have seen the monster as a beautiful and still mysterious object. Conway said of the monster group: "There's never been any kind of explanation of why it's there, and it's obviously not there just by coincidence. It's got too many intriguing properties for it all to be just an accident." Simon P. Norton, an expert on the properties of the monster group, is quoted as saying, "I can explain what Monstrous Moonshine is in one sentence, it is the voice of God."

== See also ==
- Supersingular prime, the prime numbers that divide the order of the monster
- Bimonster group, the wreath square of the monster group, which has a surprisingly simple presentation

== Sources ==
- Borcherds, R.E. (October 2002). "What is ... the Monster?" (PDF). Notices of the American Mathematical Society. 49 (9) – via ams.org.
- le Bruyn, Lieven (22 April 2009). "The monster graph and McKay's observation". neverendingbooks.
- Conway, J.H. (1985). "A simple construction for the Fischer–Griess monster group". Inventiones Mathematicae. 79 (3): 513–540. Bibcode:1985InMat..79..513C. doi:10.1007/BF01388521. MR 0782233. S2CID 123340529.
- Conway, J.H.; Norton, S.P. (1979). "Monstrous moonshine". Bulletin of the London Mathematical Society. 11 (3): 308–339. doi:10.1112/blms/11.3.308.
- Dietrich, Heiko; Lee, Melissa; Popiel, Tomasz (2025). "The maximal subgroups of the Monster". Advances in Mathematics. 469 110214. arXiv:2304.14646. Bibcode:2023arXiv230414646D. doi:10.1016/j.aim.2025.110214.
- Duncan, John F. (2008). "Arithmetic groups and the affine E8 Dynkin diagram". arXiv:0810.1465 [RT math. RT].
- Gardner, M. (June 1980). "The capture of the monster: A mathematical group with a ridiculous number of elements". Mathematical games. Scientific American. Vol. 242, no. 6. pp. 20–33. ISSN 0036-8733. JSTOR 24966339 – via scientificamerican.com.
- Griess, R.L. (1976). "The structure of the monster simple group". In Scott, W. Richard; Gross, Fletcher (eds.). Proceedings of the Conference on Finite Groups. Boston, MA: Academic Press. pp. 113–118. ISBN 978-012633650-4. MR 0399248.;
- Griess, R.L. (1982). "The friendly giant" (PDF). Inventiones Mathematicae. 69 (1): 1–102. Bibcode:1982InMat..69....1G. doi:10.1007/BF01389186. hdl:2027.42/46608. MR 0671653. S2CID 123597150 – via U.Mich. (lib.umich.edu).
- Griess, R.L.; Meierfrankenfeld, Ulrich; Segev, Yoav (1989). "A uniqueness proof for the Monster". Annals of Mathematics. Second Series. 130 (3): 567–602. doi:10.2307/1971455. JSTOR 1971455. MR 1025167.
- Haran, B.J. (2014). Life, death, and the Monster (John Conway). Numberphile – via YouTube.
- He, Y.-H.; McKay, J.K.S. (25 May 2015). "Sporadic and Exceptional". arXiv:1505.06742 [AG math. AG].
- Holmes, Petra E.; Wilson, R.A. (2002). "A new maximal subgroup of the Monster". Journal of Algebra. 251 (1): 435–447. doi:10.1006/jabr.2001.9037. MR 1900293.
- Holmes, Petra E.; Wilson, R.A. (2004). "PSL_{2}(59) is a subgroup of the Monster". Journal of the London Mathematical Society. Second Series. 69 (1): 141–152. doi:10.1112/S0024610703004915. MR 2025332. S2CID 122913546.
- Holmes, Petra E.; Wilson, R.A. (2008). "On subgroups of the Monster containing A_{5}'s". Journal of Algebra. 319 (7): 2653–2667. doi:10.1016/j.jalgebra.2003.11.014. MR 2397402.
- Masters, Alexander (22 February 2019). "Simon Norton". Obituary. The Guardian.
- Norton, S.P. (1985). The uniqueness of the Fischer–Griess Monster. Finite groups – coming of age. Contemp. Math. Vol. 45. Providence, RI: American Mathematical Society. pp. 271–285. doi:10.1090/conm/045/822242. ISBN 978-082185047-3. MR 0822242.;
- Norton, S.P.; Wilson, R.A. (2013). "A correction to the 41 structure of the Monster, a construction of a new maximal subgroup L2(41) and a new Moonshine phenomenon" (PDF). Journal of the London Mathematical Society. Second Series. 87 (3): 943–962. doi:10.1112/jlms/jds078. S2CID 7075719 – via Q.Mary.U.London.
- Roberts, S. (2013). Curiosities: Pursuing the Monster. Princeton, NJ: Institute for Advanced Study.
- Ronan, M.A. (2006). Symmetry and the Monster. Oxford University Press. ISBN 019280722-6.
- Thompson, J.G. (1979). "Uniqueness of the Fischer-Griess monster". Bulletin of the London Mathematical Society. 11 (3): 340–346. doi:10.1112/blms/11.3.340. MR 0554400.
- Thompson, J.G. (1984). "Some finite groups which appear as Gal L/K, where K ⊆ Q(μ_{n})". Journal of Algebra. 89 (2): 437–499. doi:10.1016/0021-8693(84)90228-X. MR 0751155.
- Tits, J. (1983). "Le Monstre (d'après R. Griess, B. Fischer et al.)". Astérisque (121): 105–122. MR 0768956. Zbl 0548.20010.
- Tits, J. (1984). "On R. Griess' "friendly giant"". Inventiones Mathematicae. 78 (3): 491–499. Bibcode:1984InMat..78..491T. doi:10.1007/BF01388446. MR 0768989. S2CID 122379975.
- Wilson, R.A. (2001). "The Monster is a Hurwitz group". Journal of Group Theory. 4 (4): 367–374. doi:10.1515/jgth.2001.027. MR 1859175. Archived from the original on 2012-03-05 – via mat.bham.ac.uk/.
- Wilson, R.A. (2010). "New computations in the Monster". Moonshine: The first quarter century and beyond. London Math. Soc. Lecture Note Ser. Vol. 372. Cambridge University Press. pp. 393–403. ISBN 978-052110664-1. MR 2681789.
- Wilson, R.A. (2016). "Is the Suzuki group Sz(8) a subgroup of the Monster?" (PDF). Bulletin of the London Mathematical Society. 48 (2): 355–364. arXiv:1508.04996. doi:10.1112/blms/bdw012. MR 3483073. S2CID 123219818 – via Q.Mary.U.London / research online (qmro.qmul.ac.uk).
