= Janko group J1 =

Sporadic simple group

In the area of modern algebra known as group theory, the Janko group J_{1} is a sporadic simple group of order

$$175,560=2^3\cdot 3\cdot 5\cdot 7\cdot 11\cdot 19\approx 2\times 10^5$$.

== History ==
$J_1$ is one of the 26 sporadic groups and was originally described by Zvonimir Janko in 1965. It is the only Janko group whose existence was proved by Janko himself and was the first sporadic group to be found since the discovery of the Mathieu groups in the 19th century. Its discovery launched the modern theory of sporadic groups.

In 1986 Robert A. Wilson showed that $J_1$ cannot be a subgroup of the monster group. Thus it is one of the 6 sporadic groups called the pariahs.

== Properties ==
The smallest faithful complex representation of $J_1$ has dimension 56. $J_1$ can be characterized abstractly as the unique simple group with abelian 2-Sylow subgroups and with an involution whose centralizer is isomorphic to the direct product of the group of order two and the alternating group $A_5$ of order 60, which is to say, the rotational icosahedral group. That was Janko's original conception of the group.

In fact, Janko and Thompson were investigating groups similar to the Ree groups $^2G_2(3^{2n+1})$, and showed that if a simple group $G$ has abelian Sylow 2-subgroups and a centralizer of an involution of the form $\Z/2\Z\times\operatorname{PSL}_2(q)$ for $q$ a prime power at least 3, then either $q$ is a power of 3 and $G$ has the same order as a Ree group (it was later shown that $G$ must be a Ree group in this case) or $q$ is 4 or 5. Note that $\operatorname{PSL}_2(4) = \operatorname{PSL}_2(5) = A_5$. This last exceptional case led to the Janko group $J_1$.

$J_1$ has no outer automorphisms and its Schur multiplier is trivial.

$J_1$ is contained in the O'Nan group as the subgroup of elements fixed by an outer automorphism of order 2.

$J_1$ is the unique finite group $G$ with the property that for $C$ any nontrivial conjugacy class, every element of $G$ is equal to $xy$ for some $x,y$ in $C$.

The degrees of irreducible representations of the Janko group J_{1} are 1, 56, 56, 76, 76, 77, 77, 77, 120, 120, 120, 133, 133, 133, 209 (sequence A003904 in the OEIS).

== Constructions ==
=== Modulo 11 representation ===
Janko found a modular representation in terms of $7\times 7$ orthogonal matrices in the field of eleven elements, with generators given by

$$Y = \left ( \begin{matrix}
0 & 1 & 0 & 0 & 0 & 0 & 0 \\
0 & 0 & 1 & 0 & 0 & 0 & 0 \\
0 & 0 & 0 & 1 & 0 & 0 & 0 \\
0 & 0 & 0 & 0 & 1 & 0 & 0 \\
0 & 0 & 0 & 0 & 0 & 1 & 0 \\
0 & 0 & 0 & 0 & 0 & 0 & 1 \\
1 & 0 & 0 & 0 & 0 & 0 & 0 \end{matrix} \right )$$

and

$$Z = \left ( \begin{matrix}
-3 & +2 & -1 & -1 & -3 & -1 & -3 \\
-2 & +1 & +1 & +3 & +1 & +3 & +3 \\
-1 & -1 & -3 & -1 & -3 & -3 & +2 \\
-1 & -3 & -1 & -3 & -3 & +2 & -1 \\
-3 & -1 & -3 & -3 & +2 & -1 & -1 \\
+1 & +3 & +3 & -2 & +1 & +1 & +3 \\
+3 & +3 & -2 & +1 & +1 & +3 & +1 \end{matrix} \right ).$$

$Y$ has order 7 and $Z$ has order 5. Janko (1966) credited W. A. Coppel for recognizing this representation as an embedding into Dickson's simple group G_{2}(11) (which has a 7-dimensional representation over the field with 11 elements).

=== Permutation representation ===
$J_1$ is the automorphism group of the Livingstone graph, a distance-transitive graph with 266 vertices and 1463 edges. The stabilizer of a vertex is $\operatorname{PSL}_2(11)$, and the stabilizer of an edge is $2\times A_5$.

This permutation representation can be constructed implicitly by starting with the subgroup $\operatorname{PSL}_2(11)$ and adjoining 11 involutions $t^0, \dots, t^X$. $\operatorname{PSL}_2(11)$ permutes these involutions under the exceptional 11-point representation, so they may be identified with points in the Payley biplane. The following relations (combined) are sufficient to define $J_1$:

- Given points $i$ and $j$, there are 2 lines containing both $i$ and $j$, and 3 points lie on neither of these lines: the product $t^it^jt^it^jt^i$ is the unique involution in $\operatorname{PSL}_2(11)$ that fixes those 3 points.
- Given points $i$, $j$, and $k$ that do not lie in a common line, the product $t^it^jt^kt^it^j$ is the unique element of order 6 in $\operatorname{PSL}_2(11)$ that sends $i$ to $j$, $j$ to $k$, $k$ back to $i$, so $(t^it^jt^kt^it^j)^j$ is the unique involution that fixes these 3 points.

=== Presentation ===
There is also a pair of generators $a$, $b$ such that

$$a^2 = b^3 = (ab)^7 = (abab^{-1})^{10} = 1$$

$J_1$ is thus a Hurwitz group, a finite homomorphic image of the (2,3,7) triangle group.

== Maximal subgroups ==
Janko (1966) found the 7 conjugacy classes of maximal subgroups of $J_1$ shown in the table. Maximal simple subgroups of order 660 afford $J_1$ a permutation representation of degree 266. He found that there are 2 conjugacy classes of subgroups isomorphic to the alternating group $A_5$, both found in the simple subgroups of order 660. $J_1$ has non-abelian simple proper subgroups of only 2 isomorphism types.

Maximal subgroups of J_{1}
No.	Structure	Order	Index	Description
1	L_{2}(11)	660 = 2^{2}·3·5·11	266 = 2·7·19	fixes point in smallest permutation representation
2	2^{3}:7:3	168 = 2^{3}·3·7	1,045 = 5·11·19	normalizer of Sylow 2-subgroup
3	2×A_{5}	120 = 2^{3}·3·5	1,463 = 7·11·19	centralizer of involution
4	19:6	114 = 2·3·19	1,540 = 2^{2}·5·7·11	normalizer of Sylow 19-subgroup
5	11:10	110 = 2·5·11	1,596 = 2^{2}·3·7·19	normalizer of Sylow 11-subgroup
6	D_{6}×D_{10}	60 = 2^{2}·3·5	2,926 = 2·7·11·19	normalizer of Sylow 3-subgroup and Sylow 5-subgroup
7	7:6	42 = 2·3·7	4,180 = 2^{2}·5·11·19	normalizer of Sylow 7-subgroup

In this table, $D_{2n}$ is the dihedral group of order $2n$.

== Number of elements of each order ==
The greatest order of any element of the group is 19. The conjugacy class orders and sizes are found in the ATLAS.

Order	No. elements	Conjugacy
1 = 1	1 = 1	1 class
2 = 2	1463 = 7 · 11 · 19	1 class
3 = 3	5852 = 2^{2} · 7 · 11 · 19	1 class
5 = 5	11704 = 2^{3} · 7 · 11 · 19	2 classes, power equivalent
6 = 2 · 3	29260 = 2^{2} · 5 · 7 · 11 · 19	1 class
7 = 7	25080 = 2^{3} · 3 · 5 · 11 · 19	1 class
10 = 2 · 5	35112 = 2^{3} · 3 · 7 · 11 · 19	2 classes, power equivalent
11 = 11	15960 = 2^{3} · 3 · 5 · 7 · 19	1 class
15 = 3 · 5	23408 = 2^{4} · 7 · 11 · 19	2 classes, power equivalent
19 = 19	27720 = 2^{3} · 3^{2} · 5 · 7 · 11	3 classes, power equivalent
