= Subquotient =

Group-theoretic concept

In the mathematical fields of category theory and abstract algebra, a subquotient is a quotient object of a subobject. Subquotients are particularly important in abelian categories, and in group theory, where they are also known as sections, though this conflicts with a different meaning in category theory.

So in the algebraic structure of groups, $H$ is a subquotient of $G$ if there exists a subgroup $G'$ of $G$ and a normal subgroup $G''$ of $G'$ so that $H$ is isomorphic to $G'/G''$.

In the literature about sporadic groups wordings like "$H$ is involved in $G$" can be found with the apparent meaning of "$H$ is a subquotient of $G$".

As in the context of subgroups, in the context of subquotients the term trivial may be used for the two subquotients $G$ and $\{1\}$ which are present in every group $G$.

A quotient of a subrepresentation of a representation (of, say, a group) might be called a subquotient representation; e. g., Harish-Chandra's subquotient theorem.

== Example ==
There are subquotients of groups which are neither a subgroup nor a quotient of it. For example, according to the article Sporadic group, Fi_{22} has a double cover which is a subgroup of Fi_{23}, so it is a subquotient of Fi_{23} without being a subgroup or quotient of it.

== Order relation ==
The relation subquotient of is an order relation, which shall be denoted by $\preceq$. It shall be proved for groups.

Notation
Let G be a group, let G′ be a subgroup of G, let G′′ be a normal subgroup of G′, and let H be the quotient group G′ / G′′. Then we say that H is a subquotient of G. In symbols, let G′′ ◃ G′ ≤ G and H = G′ / G′′; then H ⪯ G. This relationship has the following properties:

1. Reflexivity: $G\preceq G$, i. e. every element is related to itself. Indeed, $G$ is isomorphic to the subquotient $G/\{1\}$ of $G$.
2. Antisymmetry: if $G\preceq H$ and $H\preceq G$ then $G\cong H$; that is, no two distinct elements precede each other. Indeed, a comparison of the group orders of $G$ and $H$ then yields $|G| = |H|$ from which $G\cong H$.
3. Transitivity: if $H'/H'' \preceq H$ and $H\preceq G$ then $H'/H'' \preceq G$.

=== Proof of transitivity for groups ===
Let $H'/H''$ be a subquotient of $H$, let $H := G'/G''$ be a subquotient of $G$, and let $\varphi \colon G' \to H$ be the canonical homomorphism. Then in the following diagram, all vertical ($\downarrow$) maps $\varphi \colon X \to Y, \; x \mapsto x \, G''$

	$G''$	$\leq$	$\varphi^{-1}(H'')$	$\leq$	$\varphi^{-1}(H')$	$\vartriangleleft$	$G'$
$\varphi\!:$	$\Big\downarrow$		$\Big\downarrow$		$\Big\downarrow$		$\Big\downarrow$
	$\{1\}$	$\leq$	$H''$	$\vartriangleleft$	$H'$	$\vartriangleleft$	$H$

are surjective for the respective pairs

$(X,Y) \; \; \; \in$	$\Bigl\{\bigl(G'', \{1\}\bigr) \Bigr.$	$,$	$\bigl(\varphi^{-1}(H''),H''\bigr)$	$,$	$\bigl(\varphi^{-1}(H'),H'\bigr)$	$,$	$\Bigl.\bigl(G',H\bigr)\Bigr\} .$

The preimages $\varphi^{-1}\left(H'\right)$ and $\varphi^{-1}\left(H''\right)$ are both subgroups of $G'$ containing $G'' ,$ and it is $\varphi\left(\varphi^{-1}\left(H'\right)\right) = H'$ and $\varphi\left(\varphi^{-1}\left(H''\right)\right) = H'',$ because every $h \in H$ has a preimage $g \in G'$ with $\varphi(g) = h .$ Moreover, the subgroup $\varphi^{-1}\left(H''\right)$ is normal in $\varphi^{-1}\left(H'\right) .$

As a consequence, the subquotient $H'/H''$ of $H$ is a subquotient of $G$ of the form $H'/H'' \cong \varphi^{-1}\left(H'\right)/\varphi^{-1}\left(H''\right) .$

=== Relation to cardinal order ===
In constructive set theory, where the law of excluded middle does not necessarily hold, one can consider the relation subquotient of as replacing the usual order relation(s) on cardinals. When one has the law of the excluded middle, then a subquotient $Y$ of $X$ is either the empty set or there is an onto function $X\to Y$. This order relation is traditionally denoted $\leq^\ast .$ If additionally the axiom of choice holds, then $Y$ has a one-to-one function to $X$ and this order relation is the usual $\leq$ on corresponding cardinals.

== See also ==
- Homological algebra
- Subcountable
