= Covering groups of the alternating and symmetric groups =

In the mathematical area of group theory, the covering groups of the alternating and symmetric groups are groups that are used to understand the projective representations of the alternating and symmetric groups. The covering groups were classified in (Schur 1911): for n ≥ 4, the covering groups are 2-fold covers except for the alternating groups of degree 6 and 7 where the covers are 6-fold.

For example the binary icosahedral group covers the icosahedral group, an alternating group of degree 5, and the binary tetrahedral group covers the tetrahedral group, an alternating group of degree 4.

== Definition and classification ==
A group homomorphism from D to G is said to be a Schur cover of the finite group G if:

1. the kernel is contained both in the center and the commutator subgroup of D, and
2. amongst all such homomorphisms, this D has maximal size.

The Schur multiplier of G is the kernel of any Schur cover and has many interpretations. When the homomorphism is understood, the group D is often called the Schur cover or Darstellungsgruppe.

The Schur covers of the symmetric and alternating groups were classified in (Schur 1911). The symmetric group of degree n ≥ 4 has Schur covers of order 2⋅n! There are two isomorphism classes if n ≠ 6 and one isomorphism class if n = 6. The alternating group of degree n has one isomorphism class of Schur cover, which has order n! except when n is 6 or 7, in which case the Schur cover has order 3⋅n!.

== Finite presentations ==
Schur covers can be described by means of generators and relations. The symmetric group S_{n} has a presentation on n − 1 generators t_{i} for i = 1, 2, ..., n − 1 and relations

t_{i}t_{i} = 1, for 1 ≤ i ≤ n − 1
t_{i+1}t_{i}t_{i+1} = t_{i}t_{i+1}t_{i}, for 1 ≤ i ≤ n − 2
t_{j}t_{i} = t_{i}t_{j}, for 1 ≤ i < i + 2 ≤ j ≤ n − 1.

These relations can be used to describe two non-isomorphic covers of the symmetric group. One covering group 2⋅S^{−}_{n} has generators z, t_{1}, ..., t_{n−1} and relations:

zz = 1
t_{i}t_{i} = z, for 1 ≤ i ≤ n − 1
t_{i+1}t_{i}t_{i+1} = t_{i}t_{i+1}t_{i}, for 1 ≤ i ≤ n − 2
t_{j}t_{i} = t_{i}t_{j}z, for 1 ≤ i < i + 2 ≤ j ≤ n − 1.

The same group 2⋅S^{−}_{n} can be given the following presentation using the generators z and s_{i} given by t_{i} or t_{i}z according as i is odd or even:

zz = 1
s_{i}s_{i} = z, for 1 ≤ i ≤ n − 1
s_{i+1}s_{i}s_{i+1} = s_{i}s_{i+1}s_{i}z, for 1 ≤ i ≤ n − 2
s_{j}s_{i} = s_{i}s_{j}z, for 1 ≤ i < i + 2 ≤ j ≤ n − 1.

The other covering group 2⋅S^{+}_{n} has generators z, t_{1}, ..., t_{n−1} and relations:

zz = 1, zt_{i} = t_{i}z, for 1 ≤ i ≤ n − 1
t_{i}t_{i} = 1, for 1 ≤ i ≤ n − 1
t_{i+1}t_{i}t_{i+1} = t_{i}t_{i+1}t_{i}z, for 1 ≤ i ≤ n − 2
t_{j}t_{i} = t_{i}t_{j}z, for 1 ≤ i < i+2 ≤ j ≤ n − 1.

The same group 2⋅S^{+}_{n} can be given the following presentation using the generators z and s_{i} given by t_{i} or t_{i}z according as i is odd or even:

zz = 1, zs_{i} = s_{i}z, for 1 ≤ i ≤ n − 1
s_{i}s_{i} = 1, for 1 ≤ i ≤ n − 1
s_{i+1}s_{i}s_{i+1} = s_{i}s_{i+1}s_{i}, for 1 ≤ i ≤ n − 2
s_{j}s_{i} = s_{i}s_{j}z, for 1 ≤ i < i + 2 ≤ j ≤ n − 1.

Sometimes all of the relations of the symmetric group are expressed as (t_{i}t_{j})^{m_{ij}} = 1, where m_{ij} are non-negative integers, namely m_{ii} = 1, m_{i,i+1} = 3, and m_{ij} = 2, for 1 ≤ i < i + 2 ≤ j ≤ n − 1. The presentation of 2⋅S^{−}_{n} becomes particularly simple in this form: (t_{i}t_{j})^{m_{ij}} = z, and zz = 1. The group 2⋅S^{+}_{n} has the nice property that its generators all have order 2.

== Projective representations ==
Covering groups were introduced by Issai Schur to classify projective representations of groups. A (complex) linear representation of a group G is a group homomorphism G → GL(n, C) from the group G to a general linear group, while a projective representation is a homomorphism G → PGL(n, C) from G to a projective linear group. Projective representations of G correspond naturally to linear representations of the covering group of G.

The projective representations of alternating and symmetric groups are the subject of the book (Hoffman & Humphreys 1992).

== Integral homology ==
Covering groups correspond to the second group homology group, H_{2}(G, Z), also known as the Schur multiplier. The Schur multipliers of the alternating groups A_{n} (in the case where n is at least 4) are the cyclic groups of order 2, except in the case where n is either 6 or 7, in which case there is also a triple cover. In these cases, then, the Schur multiplier is the cyclic group of order 6, and the covering group is a 6-fold cover.

H_{2}(A_{n}, Z) = 0 for n ≤ 3
H_{2}(A_{n}, Z) = Z/2Z for n = 4, 5
H_{2}(A_{n}, Z) = Z/6Z for n = 6, 7
H_{2}(A_{n}, Z) = Z/2Z for n ≥ 8

For the symmetric group, the Schur multiplier vanishes for n ≤ 3, and is the cyclic group of order 2 for n ≥ 4:

H_{2}(S_{n}, Z) = 0 for n ≤ 3
H_{2}(S_{n}, Z) = Z/2Z for n ≥ 4

== Construction of double covers ==
The double cover of the alternating group can be constructed via the spin representation that covers the usual linear representation of the alternating group.

The double covers can be constructed as spin (respectively, pin) covers of faithful, irreducible, linear representations of A_{n} and S_{n}. These spin representations exist for all n, but are the covering groups only for n ≥ 4 (n ≠ 6, 7 for A_{n}). For n ≤ 3, S_{n} and A_{n} are their own Schur covers.

The alternating group, symmetric group, and their double covers are related in this way, and have orthogonal representations and covering spin/pin representations in the corresponding diagram of orthogonal and spin/pin groups.

Explicitly, S_{n} acts on the n-dimensional space R^{n} by permuting coordinates (in matrices, as permutation matrices). This has a 1-dimensional trivial subrepresentation corresponding to vectors with all coordinates equal, and the complementary (n − 1)-dimensional subrepresentation (of vectors whose coordinates sum to 0) is irreducible for n ≥ 4. Geometrically, this is the symmetries of the (n − 1)-simplex, and algebraically, it yields maps $A_n \hookrightarrow \operatorname{SO}(n-1)$ and $S_n \hookrightarrow \operatorname{O}(n-1)$ expressing these as discrete subgroups (point groups). The special orthogonal group has a 2-fold cover by the spin group Spin(n) → SO(n), and restricting this cover to A_{n} and taking the preimage yields a 2-fold cover 2⋅A_{n} → A_{n}. A similar construction with a pin group yields the 2-fold cover of the symmetric group: Pin_{±}(n) → O(n). As there are two pin groups, there are two distinct 2-fold covers of the symmetric group, 2⋅S^{±}_{n}, also called $\tilde \mathrm{S}_n$ and Ŝ_{n}.

== Construction of triple cover for n = 6, 7 ==
The triple covering of A_{6}, denoted 3⋅A_{6}, and the corresponding triple cover of S_{6}, denoted 3⋅S_{6}, can be constructed as symmetries of a certain set of vectors in a complex 6-space. While the exceptional triple covers of A_{6} and A_{7} extend to extensions of S_{6} and S_{7}, these extensions are not central and so do not form Schur covers.

This construction is important in the study of the sporadic groups, and in much of the exceptional behavior of small classical and exceptional groups, including: construction of the Mathieu group M_{24}, the exceptional covers of the projective unitary group U_{4}(3) and the projective special linear group $L_3(4),$ and the exceptional double cover of the group of Lie type G_{2}(4).

== Exceptional isomorphisms ==
For low dimensions there are exceptional isomorphisms with the map from a special linear group over a finite field to the projective special linear group.

For n = 3, the symmetric group is SL(2, 2) ≅ PSL(2, 2) and is its own Schur cover.

For n = 4, the Schur cover of the alternating group is given by SL(2, 3) → PSL(2, 3) ≅ A_{4}, which can also be thought of as the binary tetrahedral group covering the tetrahedral group. Similarly, GL(2, 3) → PGL(2, 3) ≅ S_{4} is a Schur cover, but there is a second non-isomorphic Schur cover of S_{4} contained in GL(2,9) – note that 9 = 3^{2} so this is extension of scalars of GL(2, 3). In terms of the above presentations, GL(2, 3) ≅ Ŝ_{4}.

For n = 5, the Schur cover of the alternating group is given by SL(2, 5) → PSL(2, 5) ≅ A_{5}, which can also be thought of as the binary icosahedral group covering the icosahedral group. Though PGL(2, 5) ≅ S_{5}, GL(2, 5) → PGL(2, 5) is not a Schur cover as the kernel is not contained in the derived subgroup of GL(2 ,5). The Schur cover of PGL(2, 5) is contained in GL(2, 25) – as before, 25 = 5^{2}, so this extends the scalars.

For n = 6, the double cover of the alternating group is given by SL(2, 9) → PSL(2, 9) ≅ A_{6}. While PGL(2, 9) is contained in the automorphism group PΓL(2, 9) of PSL(2, 9) ≅ A_{6}, PGL(2, 9) is not isomorphic to S_{6}, and its Schur covers (which are double covers) are not contained in nor a quotient of GL(2, 9). Note that in almost all cases, $S_n \cong \operatorname{Aut}(A_n),$ with the unique exception of A_{6}, due to the exceptional outer automorphism of A_{6}. Another subgroup of the automorphism group of A_{6} is M_{10}, the Mathieu group of degree 10, whose Schur cover is a triple cover. The Schur covers of the symmetric group S_{6} itself have no faithful representations as a subgroup of GL(d, 9) for d ≤ 3. The four Schur covers of the automorphism group PΓL(2, 9) of A_{6} are double covers.

For n = 8, the alternating group A_{8} is isomorphic to SL(4, 2) = PSL(4, 2), and so SL(4, 2) → PSL(4, 2), which is 1-to-1, not 2-to-1, is not a Schur cover.

== Properties ==
Schur covers of finite perfect groups are superperfect, that is both their first and second integral homology vanish. In particular, the double covers of A_{n} for n ≥ 4 are superperfect, except for n = 6, 7, and the six-fold covers of A_{n} are superperfect for n = 6, 7.

As stem extensions of a simple group, the covering groups of A_{n} are quasisimple groups for n ≥ 5.
