= Projective group (disambiguation) =

In mathematics, projective group may refer to:

- Projective linear group or one of the related linear groups

- Projective orthogonal group
- Projective unitary group
- Projective symplectic group
- Projective semilinear group

- Projective profinite group, a profinite group with the embedding property
