= Almost simple group =

In mathematics, a group is said to be almost simple if it contains a non-abelian simple group and is contained within the automorphism group of that simple group – that is, if it fits between a (non-abelian) simple group and its automorphism group. In symbols, a group $A$ is almost simple if there is a (non-abelian) simple group S such that $S \leq A \leq \operatorname{Aut}(S)$, where the inclusion of $S$ in $\mathrm{Aut}(S)$ is the action by conjugation, which is faithful since $S$ has a trivial center.

== Examples ==
- Trivially, non-abelian simple groups and the full group of automorphisms are almost simple. For $n=5$ or $n \geq 7,$ the symmetric group $\mathrm{S}_n$ is the automorphism group of the simple alternating group $\mathrm{A}_n,$ so $\mathrm{S}_n$ is almost simple in this trivial sense.
- For $n=6$ there is a proper example, as $\mathrm{S}_6$ sits properly between the simple $\mathrm{A}_6$ and $\operatorname{Aut}(\mathrm{A}_6),$ due to the exceptional outer automorphism of $\mathrm{A}_6.$ Two other groups, the Mathieu group $\mathrm{M}_{10}$ and the projective general linear group $\operatorname{PGL}_2(9)$ also sit properly between $\mathrm{A}_6$ and $\operatorname{Aut}(\mathrm{A}_6).$

== Properties ==
The full automorphism group of a non-abelian simple group is a complete group (the conjugation map is an isomorphism to the automorphism group), but proper subgroups of the full automorphism group need not be complete.

== Structure ==
By the Schreier conjecture, now generally accepted as a corollary of the classification of finite simple groups, the outer automorphism group of a finite simple group is a solvable group. Thus a finite almost simple group is an extension of a solvable group by a simple group.

== See also ==
- Quasisimple group
- Semisimple group
