= Exceptional isomorphism =

Mathematical coincidence

In mathematics, an exceptional isomorphism, also called an accidental isomorphism, is an isomorphism between members a_{i} and b_{j} of two families, usually infinite, of mathematical objects, which is incidental, in that it is not an instance of a general pattern of such isomorphisms. (Note: Because these series of objects are presented differently, they are not identical objects (do not have identical descriptions), but turn out to describe the same object, hence one refers to this as an isomorphism, not an equality (identity).) These coincidences are at times considered a matter of trivia, but in other respects they can give rise to consequential phenomena, such as exceptional objects. In the following, coincidences are organized according to the structures where they occur.

== Finite groups ==
The exceptional isomorphisms between the series of finite simple groups mostly involve projective special linear groups and alternating groups, and are:

- PSL_{2}(4) ≅ PSL_{2}(5) ≅ A_{5}, the smallest non-abelian simple group (order 60);
- PSL_{2}(7) ≅ PSL_{3}(2), the second-smallest non-abelian simple group (order 168) – PSL(2,7);
- PSL_{2}(9) ≅ A_{6};
- PSL_{4}(2) ≅ A_{8};
- PSU_{4}(2) ≅ PSp_{4}(3), between a projective special unitary group and a projective symplectic group.

=== Alternating groups and symmetric groups ===
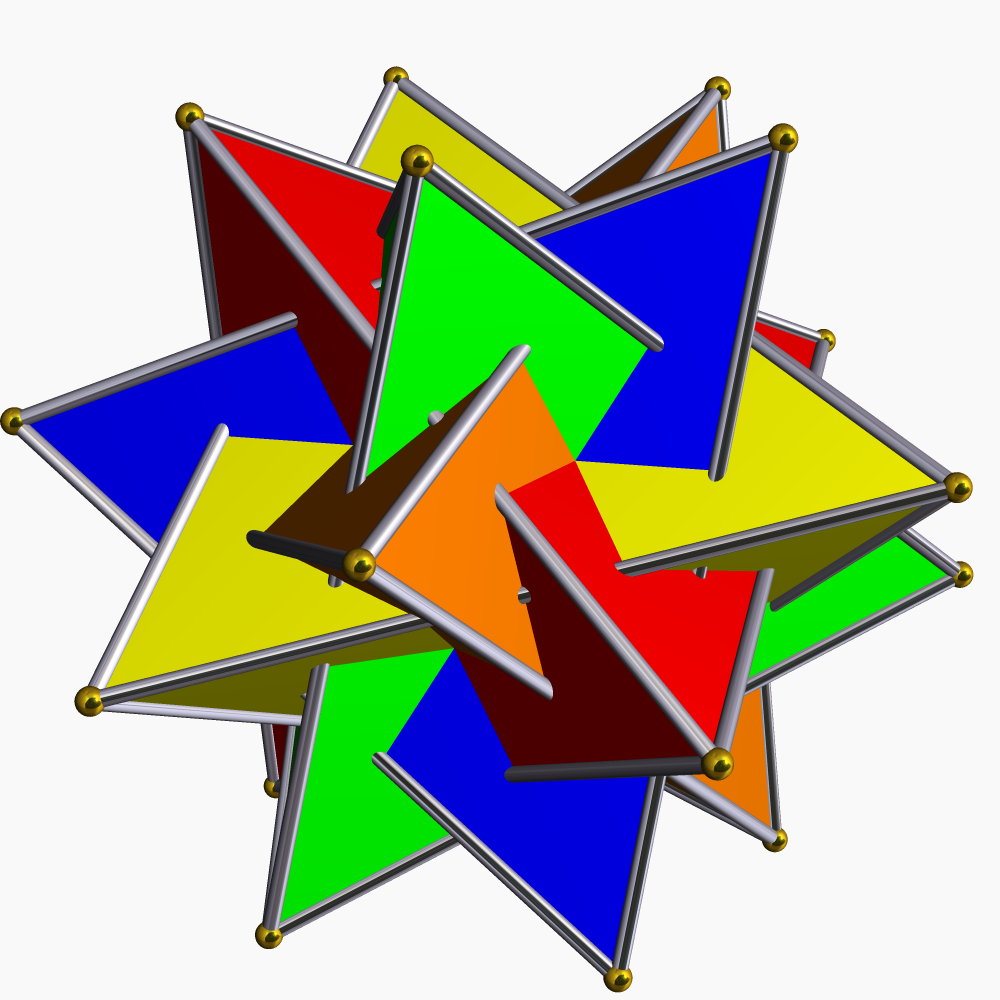
The compound of five tetrahedra expresses the exceptional isomorphism between the chiral icosahedral group and the alternating group on five letters.

There are coincidences between symmetric/alternating groups and small groups of Lie type/polyhedral groups:

- S_{3} ≅ PSL_{2}(2) ≅ dihedral group of order 6,
- A_{4} ≅ PSL_{2}(3),
- S_{4} ≅ PGL_{2}(3) ≅ PSL_{2}(Z / 4),
- A_{5} ≅ PSL_{2}(4) ≅ PSL_{2}(5),
- S_{5} ≅ PΓL_{2}(4) ≅ PGL_{2}(5),
- A_{6} ≅ PSL_{2}(9) ≅ Sp_{4}(2)′,
- S_{6} ≅ Sp_{4}(2),
- A_{8} ≅ PSL_{4}(2) ≅ O^{+}_{6}(2)′,
- S_{8} ≅ O^{+}_{6}(2).

These can all be explained in a systematic way by using linear algebra (and the action of S_{n} on affine nspace) to define the isomorphism going from the right side to the left side. (The above isomorphisms for A_{8} and S_{8} are linked via the exceptional isomorphism SL_{4} / μ_{2} ≅ SO_{6}.)

There are also some coincidences with symmetries of regular polyhedra: the alternating group A_{5} agrees with the chiral icosahedral group (itself an exceptional object), and the double cover of the alternating group A_{5} is the binary icosahedral group.

=== Trivial group ===
The trivial group arises in numerous ways. The trivial group is often omitted from the beginning of a classical family. For instance:

- C_{1}, the cyclic group of order 1;
- A_{0} ≅ A_{1} ≅ A_{2}, the alternating group on 0, 1, or 2 letters;
- S_{0} ≅ S_{1}, the symmetric group on 0 or 1 letters;
- GL(0, K) ≅ SL(0, K) ≅ PGL(0, K) ≅ PSL(0, K), linear groups of a 0-dimensional vector space;
- SL(1, K) ≅ PGL(1, K) ≅ PSL(1, K), linear groups of a 1-dimensional vector space
- and many others.

== Spheres ==
The spheres S^{0}, S^{1}, and S^{3} admit group structures, which can be described in many ways:

- S^{0} ≅ Spin(1) ≅ O(1) ≅ (Z / 2Z)^{+} ≅ Z^{×}, the last being the group of units of the integers;
- S^{1} ≅ Spin(2) ≅ SO(2) ≅ U(1) ≅ R / Z ≅ circle group;
- S^{3} ≅ Spin(3) ≅ SU(2) ≅ Sp(1) ≅ unit quaternions.

== Classical groups ==
In addition to Spin(1), Spin(2) and Spin(3) above, there are isomorphisms for higher dimensional spin groups:

- Spin(4) ≅ Sp(1) × Sp(1) ≅ SU(2) × SU(2)
- Spin(5) ≅ Sp(2)
- Spin(6) ≅ SU(4)

Also, Spin(8) has an exceptional order 3 triality automorphism.

In non-Euclidean signature, there are also the isomorphisms

- $\mathrm{Spin}^+(1,2) \cong \mathrm{SL}(2,\mathbb R)$
- $\mathrm{Spin}^+(1,3) \cong \mathrm{SL}(2,\mathbb C)$
- $\mathrm{Spin}^+(2,2) \cong \mathrm{SL}(2,\mathbb R)\times\mathrm{SL}(2,\mathbb R)$
- $\mathrm{Spin}^+(1,4) \cong \mathrm{Sp}(1,1)$
- $\mathrm{Spin}^+(2,3) \cong \mathrm{Sp}(4,\mathbb R)$
- $\mathrm{Spin}^+(2,4) \cong \mathrm{SU}(2,2)$
- $\mathrm{Spin}^+(3,3) \cong \mathrm{SL}(4,\mathbb R)$
- $\mathrm{Spin}^+(1,5) \cong \mathrm{SL}(2,\mathbb H)$ (i.e., $\mathrm{SU}^*(4)$)

where $\mathrm{Spin}^+$ refers to the connected component of the identity.

(These group isomorphisms are sometimes presented as central isogenies or isomorphisms of the associated Lie algebras instead.)

== Coxeter–Dynkin diagrams ==
There are some exceptional isomorphisms of Dynkin diagrams, yielding isomorphisms of the corresponding Coxeter groups and of polytopes realizing the symmetries, as well as isomorphisms of Lie algebras whose root systems are described by the same diagrams. These are:

Diagram	Dynkin classification	Lie algebra	Polytope
	A_{1} = B_{1} = C_{1}	$\mathfrak{sl}_2 \cong \mathfrak{so}_3 \cong \mathfrak{sp}_2$	—
$\cong$	A_{2} = I_{2}(3)	—	2-simplex is regular 3-gon (equilateral triangle)
	BC_{2} = I_{2}(4)	$\mathfrak{so}_5 \cong \mathfrak{sp}_4$	2-cube is 2-cross polytope is regular 4-gon (square)
$\cong$	A_{1} × A_{1} = D_{2}	$\mathfrak{sl}_2 \oplus \mathfrak{sl}_2 \cong \mathfrak{so}_{4}$	—
$\cong$	A_{3} = D_{3}	$\mathfrak{sl}_4 \cong \mathfrak{so}_6$	3-simplex is 3-demihypercube (regular tetrahedron)

== See also ==
- Exceptional object
- Mathematical coincidence, for numerical coincidences
