= Mathieu group =

Five sporadic simple groups

In group theory, a topic in abstract algebra, the Mathieu groups are the five sporadic simple groups M_{11}, M_{12}, M_{22}, M_{23} and M_{24} introduced by Émile Mathieu (1861, 1873). They are multiply transitive permutation groups on 11, 12, 22, 23 or 24 objects. They are the first sporadic simple groups to be discovered.

Sometimes the notation M_{8}, M_{9}, M_{10}, M_{20}, and M_{21} is used for related groups (which act on sets of 8, 9, 10, 20, and 21 points, respectively), namely the stabilizers of points in the larger groups. While these are not sporadic simple groups, they are subgroups of the larger groups and can be used to construct the larger ones. John Conway has shown that one can also extend this sequence up, obtaining the Mathieu groupoid M_{13} acting on 13 points. M_{21} is simple, but is not a sporadic simple group, being isomorphic to the projective special linear group PSL(3,4).

== History ==
Mathieu (1861, p.271) introduced the group M_{12} as part of an investigation of multiply transitive permutation groups, and briefly mentioned (on page 274) the group M_{24}, giving its order. In Mathieu (1873) he gave further details, including explicit generating sets for his groups, but it was not easy to see from his arguments that the groups generated are not just alternating groups, and for several years the existence of his groups was controversial. Miller (1898) even published a paper mistakenly claiming to prove that M_{24} does not exist, though shortly afterwards in (Miller 1900) he pointed out that his proof was wrong, and gave a proof that the Mathieu groups are simple. Carmichael (1931) and later Witt (1938a, 1938b) finally removed the doubts about the existence of these groups, by constructing them as successive transitive extensions of permutation groups, as well as automorphism groups of Steiner systems.

After the Mathieu groups, no new sporadic groups were found until 1965, when the group J_{1} was discovered.

== Multiply transitive groups ==
Mathieu was interested in finding multiply transitive permutation groups, which will now be defined. For a natural number k, a permutation group G acting on n points is k-transitive if, given two sets of points a_{1}, ... a_{k} and b_{1}, ... b_{k} with the property that all the a_{i} are distinct and all the b_{i} are distinct, there is a group element g in G which maps a_{i} to b_{i} for each i between 1 and k. Such a group is called sharply k-transitive if the element g is unique (i.e. the action on k-tuples is regular, rather than just transitive).

M_{24} is 5-transitive, and M_{12} is sharply 5-transitive, with the other Mathieu groups (simple or not) being the subgroups corresponding to stabilizers of m points, and accordingly of lower transitivity (M_{23} is 4-transitive, etc.). These are the only two 5-transitive groups that are neither symmetric groups nor alternating groups (Cameron 1992, p. 139).

The only 4-transitive groups are the symmetric groups S_{k} for k at least 4, the alternating groups A_{k} for k at least 6, and the Mathieu groups M_{24}, M_{23}, M_{12}, and M_{11}. (Cameron 1999, p. 110) The full proof requires the classification of finite simple groups, but some special cases have been known for much longer.

It is a classical result of Jordan that the symmetric and alternating groups (of degree k and k + 2 respectively), and M_{12} and M_{11} are the only sharply k-transitive permutation groups for k at least 4.

Important examples of multiply transitive groups are the 2-transitive groups and the Zassenhaus groups. The Zassenhaus groups notably include the projective general linear group of a projective line over a finite field, PGL(2,F_{q}), which is sharply 3-transitive (see cross ratio) on $q+1$ elements.

=== Order and transitivity table ===
Group	Order	Order (product)	Factorised order	Transitivity	Simple	Sporadic
M_{24}	244823040	3·16·20·21·22·23·24	2^{10}·3^{3}·5·7·11·23	5-transitive	yes	sporadic
M_{23}	10200960	3·16·20·21·22·23	2^{7}·3^{2}·5·7·11·23	4-transitive	yes	sporadic
M_{22}	443520	3·16·20·21·22	2^{7}·3^{2}·5·7·11	3-transitive	yes	sporadic
M_{21}	20160	3·16·20·21	2^{6}·3^{2}·5·7	2-transitive	yes	≈ PSL_{3}(4)
M_{20}	960	3·16·20	2^{6}·3·5	1-transitive	no	≈2^{4}:A_{5}
M_{12}	95040	8·9·10·11·12	2^{6}·3^{3}·5·11	sharply 5-transitive	yes	sporadic
M_{11}	7920	8·9·10·11	2^{4}·3^{2}·5·11	sharply 4-transitive	yes	sporadic
M_{10}	720	8·9·10	2^{4}·3^{2}·5	sharply 3-transitive	almost	M_{10}' ≈ Alt_{6}
M_{9}	72	8·9	2^{3}·3^{2}	sharply 2-transitive	no	≈ PSU_{3}(2)
M_{8}	8	8	2^{3}	sharply 1-transitive (regular)	no	≈ Q

== Constructions of the Mathieu groups ==
The Mathieu groups can be constructed in various ways.

=== Permutation groups ===
M_{12} has a simple subgroup of order 660, a maximal subgroup. That subgroup is isomorphic to the projective special linear group PSL_{2}(F_{11}) over the field of 11 elements. With −1 written as a and infinity as b, two standard generators are (0123456789a) and (0b)(1a)(25)(37)(48)(69). A third generator giving M_{12} sends an element x of F_{11} to 4x^{2} − 3x^{7}; as a permutation that is (26a7)(3945).

This group turns out not to be isomorphic to any member of the infinite families of finite simple groups and is called sporadic. M_{11} is the stabilizer of a point in M_{12}, and turns out also to be a sporadic simple group. M_{10}, the stabilizer of two points, is not sporadic, but is an almost simple group whose commutator subgroup is the alternating group A_{6}. It is thus related to the exceptional outer automorphism of A_{6}. The stabilizer of 3 points is the projective special unitary group PSU(3,2^{2}), which is solvable. The stabilizer of 4 points is the quaternion group.

Likewise, M_{24} has a maximal simple subgroup of order 6072 isomorphic to PSL_{2}(F_{23}). One generator adds 1 to each element of the field (leaving the point N at infinity fixed), i.e. (0123456789ABCDEFGHIJKLM)(N), and the other sends x to −1/x, i.e. (0N)(1M)(2B)(3F)(4H)(59)(6J)(7D)(8K)(AG)(CL)(EI). A third generator giving M_{24} sends an element x of F_{23} to 4x^{4} − 3x^{15} (which sends perfect squares via x^{4} and non-perfect squares via 7x^{4}); computation shows that as a permutation this is (2G968)(3CDI4)(7HABM)(EJLKF).

The stabilizers of 1 and 2 points, M_{23} and M_{22}, also turn out to be sporadic simple groups. The stabilizer of 3 points is simple and isomorphic to the projective special linear group PSL_{3}(4).

These constructions were cited by Carmichael (1956, pp. 151, 164, 263). Dixon & Mortimer (1996, p.209) ascribe the permutations to Mathieu.

=== Automorphism groups of Steiner systems ===
There exists up to equivalence a unique S(5,8,24) Steiner system W_{24} (the Witt design). The group M_{24} is the automorphism group of this Steiner system; that is, the set of permutations which map every block to some other block. The subgroups M_{23} and M_{22} are defined to be the stabilizers of a single point and two points respectively.

Similarly, there exists up to equivalence a unique S(5,6,12) Steiner system W_{12}, and the group M_{12} is its automorphism group. The subgroup M_{11} is the stabilizer of a point.

W_{12} can be constructed from the affine geometry on the vector space F_{3} × F_{3}, an S(2,3,9) system.

An alternative construction of W_{12} is the "Kitten" of Curtis (1984).

An introduction to a construction of W_{24} via the Miracle Octad Generator of R. T. Curtis and Conway's analog for W_{12}, the miniMOG, can be found in the book by Conway and Sloane.

=== Automorphism groups on the Golay code ===
The group M_{24} is the permutation automorphism group of the extended binary Golay code W, i.e., the group of permutations on the 24 coordinates that map W to itself. All the Mathieu groups can be constructed as groups of permutations on the binary Golay code.

M_{12} has index 2 in its automorphism group, and M_{12}:2 happens to be isomorphic to a subgroup of M_{24}. M_{12} is the stabilizer of a dodecad, a codeword of 12 1's; M_{12}:2 stabilizes a partition into 2 complementary dodecads.

There is a natural connection between the Mathieu groups and the larger Conway groups, because the Leech lattice was constructed on the binary Golay code and in fact both lie in spaces of dimension 24. The Conway groups in turn are found in the Monster group. Robert Griess refers to the 20 sporadic groups found in the Monster as the Happy Family, and to the Mathieu groups as the first generation.

=== Dessins d'enfants ===
The Mathieu groups can be constructed via dessins d'enfants, with the dessin associated to M_{12} suggestively called "Monsieur Mathieu" by le Bruyn (2007).
