= Projective linear group =

Construction in group theory

Relation between the projective special linear group PSL and the projective general linear group PGL; each row and column is a short exact sequence. The set (F^{*})^{n} here is the set of nth powers of the multiplicative group of F.

In mathematics, especially in the group theoretic area of algebra, the projective linear group (also known as the projective general linear group or PGL) is the induced action of the general linear group of a vector space V on the associated projective space P(V). Explicitly, the projective linear group is the quotient group

PGL(V) = GL(V) / Z(V)

where GL(V) is the general linear group of V and Z(V) is the subgroup of all nonzero scalar transformations of V; these are quotiented out because they act trivially on the projective space and they form the kernel of the action, and the notation "Z" reflects that the scalar transformations form the center of the general linear group.

The projective special linear group, PSL, is defined analogously, as the induced action of the special linear group on the associated projective space. Explicitly:

PSL(V) = SL(V) / SZ(V)

where SL(V) is the special linear group over V and SZ(V) is the subgroup of scalar transformations with unit determinant. Here SZ is the center of SL, and is naturally identified with the group of nth roots of unity in F (where n is the dimension of V and F is the base field).

PGL and PSL are some of the fundamental groups of study, part of the so-called classical groups, and an element of PGL is called projective linear transformation, projective transformation or homography. If V is the n-dimensional vector space over a field F, namely V = F^{n}, the alternate notations PGL(n, F) and PSL(n, F) are also used.

PGL(n, F) and PSL(n, F) are isomorphic if and only if every element of F has an nth root in F. As an example, PGL(2, C) = PSL(2, C), but PGL(2, R) > PSL(2, R); this corresponds to the real projective line being orientable, and the projective special linear group only being the orientation-preserving transformations.

PGL and PSL can also be defined over a ring, with an important example being the modular group, PSL(2, Z).

== Name ==
The name comes from projective geometry, where the projective group acting on homogeneous coordinates (x_{0} : x_{1} : ... : x_{n}) is the underlying group of the geometry. (Note: This is therefore PGL(n + 1, F) for projective space of dimension n) Stated differently, the natural action of GL(V) on V descends to an action of PGL(V) on the projective space P(V).

The projective linear groups therefore generalise the case PGL(2, C) of Möbius transformations (sometimes called the Möbius group), which acts on the projective line.

Unlike the general linear group, which is generally defined axiomatically as "invertible functions preserving the linear (vector space) structure", the projective linear group is defined constructively, as a quotient of the general linear group of the associated vector space, rather than axiomatically as "invertible functions preserving the projective linear structure". This is reflected in the notation: PGL(n, F) is the group associated to GL(n, F), and is the projective linear group of (n − 1)-dimensional projective space, not n-dimensional projective space.

=== Collineations ===
A related group is the collineation group, which is defined axiomatically. A collineation is an invertible (or more generally one-to-one) map which sends collinear points to collinear points. One can define a projective space axiomatically in terms of an incidence structure (a set of points P, lines L, and an incidence relation I specifying which points lie on which lines) satisfying certain axioms – an automorphism of a projective space thus defined then being an automorphism f of the set of points and an automorphism g of the set of lines, preserving the incidence relation, (Note: "Preserving the incidence relation" means that if point p is on line l then f(p) is in g(l); formally, if (p, l) ∈ I then (f(p), g(l)) ∈ I.) which is exactly a collineation of a space to itself. Projective linear transforms are collineations (planes in a vector space correspond to lines in the associated projective space, and linear transforms map planes to planes, so projective linear transforms map lines to lines), but in general not all collineations are projective linear transforms – PGL is in general a proper subgroup of the collineation group.

Specifically, for n = 2 (a projective line), all points are collinear, so the collineation group is exactly the symmetric group of the points of the projective line, and except for F_{2} and F_{3} (where PGL is the full symmetric group), PGL is a proper subgroup of the full symmetric group on these points.

For n ≥ 3, the collineation group is the projective semilinear group, PΓL – this is PGL, twisted by field automorphisms; formally, PΓL ≅ PGL ⋊ Gal(K / k), where k is the prime field for K; this is the fundamental theorem of projective geometry. Thus for K a prime field (F_{p} or Q), PGL = PΓL, but for K a field with non-trivial Galois automorphisms (such as F_{p^{n}} for n ≥ 2 or C), the projective linear group is a proper subgroup of the collineation group, which can be thought of as "transforms preserving a projective semi-linear structure". Correspondingly, the quotient group PΓL / PGL = Gal(K / k) corresponds to "choices of linear structure", with the identity (base point) being the existing linear structure.

One may also define collineation groups for axiomatically defined projective spaces, where there is no natural notion of a projective linear transform. However, with the exception of the non-Desarguesian planes, all projective spaces are the projectivization of a linear space over a division ring though, as noted above, there are multiple choices of linear structure, namely a torsor over Gal(K / k) (for n ≥ 3).

== Elements ==
The elements of the projective linear group can be understood as "tilting the plane" along one of the axes, and then projecting to the original plane, and also have dimension n.

Rotation about the z axes rotates the projective plane, while the projectivization of rotation about lines parallel to the x or y axes yield projective rotations of the plane.

A more familiar geometric way to understand the projective transforms is via projective rotations (the elements of PSO(n + 1)), which corresponds to the stereographic projection of rotations of the unit hypersphere, and has dimension $\textstyle{1+2+\cdots+n=\binom{n+1}{2} }$. Visually, this corresponds to standing at the origin (or placing a camera at the origin), and turning one's angle of view, then projecting onto a flat plane. Rotations in axes perpendicular to the hyperplane preserve the hyperplane and yield a rotation of the hyperplane (an element of SO(n), which has dimension $\textstyle{1+2+\cdots+(n-1) =\binom{n}{2} }$.), while rotations in axes parallel to the hyperplane are proper projective maps, and accounts for the remaining n dimensions.

== Properties ==
- PGL sends collinear points to collinear points (it preserves projective lines), but it is not the full collineation group, which is instead either PΓL (for n > 2) or the full symmetric group for n = 2 (the projective line).
- Every (biregular) algebraic automorphism of a projective space is projective linear. The birational automorphisms form a larger group, the Cremona group.
- PGL acts faithfully on projective space: non-identity elements act non-trivially.
  Concretely, the kernel of the action of GL on projective space is exactly the scalar maps, which are quotiented out in PGL.
- PGL acts 2-transitively on projective space.
  This is because 2 distinct points in projective space correspond to 2 vectors that do not lie on a single linear space, and hence are linearly independent, and GL acts transitively on k-element sets of linearly independent vectors.
- PGL(2, K) acts sharply 3-transitively on the projective line.
  Three arbitrary points are conventionally mapped to [0, 1], [1, 1], [1, 0]; in alternative notation, 0, 1, ∞. In fractional linear transformation notation, the function (x − a)/(x − c) ⋅ (b − c)/(b − a) maps a ↦ 0, b ↦ 1, c ↦ ∞, and is the unique such map that does so. This is the cross-ratio (x, b; a, c) – see Cross-ratio § Transformational approach for details.
- For n ≥ 3, PGL(n, K) does not act 3-transitively, because it must send 3 collinear points to 3 other collinear points, not an arbitrary set. For n = 2 the space is the projective line, so all points are collinear and this is no restriction.
- PGL(2, K) does not act 4-transitively on the projective line (except for PGL(2, 3), as P^{1}(3) has 3 + 1 = 4 points, so 3-transitive implies 4-transitive); the invariant that is preserved is the cross ratio, and this determines where every other point is sent: specifying where 3 points are mapped determines the map. Thus in particular it is not the full collineation group of the projective line (except for F_{2} and F_{3}).
- PSL(2, q) and PGL(2, q) (for q > 2, and q odd for PSL) are two of the four families of Zassenhaus groups.
- PGL(n, K) is an algebraic group of dimension n^{2} − 1 and an open subgroup of the projective space P^{n^{2}−1}. As defined, the functor PSL(n, K) does not define an algebraic group, or even an fppf sheaf, and its sheafification in the fppf topology is in fact PGL(n, K).
- PSL and PGL are centerless – this is because the diagonal matrices are not only the center, but also the hypercenter (the quotient of a group by its center is not necessarily centerless). (Note: For PSL (except PSL(2, 2) and PSL(2, 3)) this follows by Grün's lemma because SL is a perfect group (hence center equals hypercenter), but for PGL and the two exceptional PSLs this requires additional checking.)

=== Fractional linear transformations ===
As for Möbius transformations, the group PGL(2, K) can be interpreted as fractional linear transformations with coefficients in K. Points in the projective line over K correspond to pairs from K^{2}, with two pairs being equivalent when they are proportional. When the second coordinate is non-zero, a point can be represented by [z, 1]. Then when ad − bc ≠ 0, the action of PGL(2, K) is by linear transformation:

$$[z,\ 1]\begin{pmatrix} a & c \\ b & d \end{pmatrix} \ = \ [az + b,\ cz + d] \ = \ \left [\frac{a z + b}{c z + d},\ 1\right ].$$

In this way successive transformations can be written as right multiplication by such matrices, and matrix multiplication can be used for the group product in PGL(2, K).

== Finite fields ==
The projective special linear groups PSL(n, F_{q}) for a finite field F_{q} are often written as PSL(n, q) or L_{n}(q). They are finite simple groups whenever n is at least 2, with two exceptions: L_{2}(2), which is isomorphic to S_{3}, the symmetric group on 3 letters, and is solvable; and L_{2}(3), which is isomorphic to A_{4}, the alternating group on 4 letters, and is also solvable. These exceptional isomorphisms can be understood as arising from the action on the projective line.

The special linear groups SL(n, q) are thus quasisimple: perfect central extensions of a simple group (unless n = 2 and q = 2 or 3).

=== History ===
The groups PSL(2, p) for any prime number p were constructed by Évariste Galois in the 1830s, and were the second family of finite simple groups, after the alternating groups. Galois constructed them as fractional linear transforms, and observed that they were simple except if p was 2 or 3; this is contained in his last letter to Chevalier. In the same letter and attached manuscripts, Galois also constructed the general linear group over a prime field, GL(ν, p), in studying the Galois group of the general equation of degree p^{ν}.

The groups PSL(n, q) (general n, general finite field) for any prime power q were then constructed in the classic 1870 text by Camille Jordan, Traité des substitutions et des équations algébriques.

=== Order ===
The order of PGL(n, q) is

(q^{n} − 1)(q^{n} − q)(q^{n} − q^{2}) ⋅⋅⋅ (q^{n} − q^{n−1})/(q − 1) = q^{n^{2}−1} − O(q^{n^{2}−3}),

which corresponds to the order of GL(n, q), divided by q − 1 for projectivization; see q-analog for discussion of such formulas. The degree is n^{2} − 1, which agrees with the dimension as an algebraic group. The "O" is for big O notation, meaning "terms involving lower order". This also equals the order of SL(n, q); there dividing by q − 1 is due to the determinant.

The order of PSL(n, q) is the order of PGL(n, q) as above, divided by gcd(n, q − 1). This is equal to |SZ(n, q)|, the number of scalar matrices with determinant 1; |F^{×} / (F^{×})^{n}|, the number of classes of element that have no nth root; and it is also the number of nth roots of unity in F_{q}. (Note: These are equal because they are the kernel and cokernel of the endomorphism F^{×} F^{×}; formally, |μ_{n}| ⋅ |(F^{×})^{n}| = |F^{×}|. More abstractly, the first realizes PSL as SL / SZ, while the second realizes PSL as the kernel of PGL → F^{×} / (F^{×})^{n}.)

=== Exceptional isomorphisms ===
In addition to the isomorphisms

L_{2}(2) ≅ S_{3}, L_{2}(3) ≅ A_{4}, and PGL(2, 3) ≅ S_{4},

there are other exceptional isomorphisms between projective special linear groups and alternating groups (these groups are all simple, as the alternating group over 5 or more letters is simple):

L_{2}(4) ≅ A_{5}
L_{2}(5) ≅ A_{5} (see § Action on p points for a proof)
L_{2}(9) ≅ A_{6}
L_{4}(2) ≅ A_{8}

The isomorphism L_{2}(9) ≅ A_{6} allows one to see the exotic outer automorphism of A_{6} in terms of field automorphism and matrix operations. The isomorphism L_{4}(2) ≅ A_{8} is of interest in the structure of the Mathieu group M_{24}.

The associated extensions SL(n, q) → PSL(n, q) are covering groups of the alternating groups (universal perfect central extensions) for A_{4}, A_{5}, by uniqueness of the universal perfect central extension; for L_{2}(9) ≅ A_{6}, the associated extension is a perfect central extension, but not universal: there is a 3-fold covering group.

The groups over F_{5} have a number of exceptional isomorphisms:

PSL(2, 5) ≅ A_{5} ≅ I, the alternating group on five elements, or equivalently the icosahedral group;
PGL(2, 5) ≅ S_{5}, the symmetric group on five elements;
SL(2, 5) ≅ 2 ⋅ A_{5} ≅ 2I the double cover of the alternating group A_{5}, or equivalently the binary icosahedral group.

They can also be used to give a construction of an exotic map S_{5} → S_{6}, as described below. Note however that GL(2, 5) is not a double cover of S_{5}, but is rather a 4-fold cover.

A further isomorphism is:

L_{2}(7) ≅ L_{3}(2) is the simple group of order 168, the second-smallest non-abelian simple group, and is not an alternating group; see PSL(2, 7).

The above exceptional isomorphisms involving the projective special linear groups are almost all of the exceptional isomorphisms between families of finite simple groups; the only other exceptional isomorphism is PSU(4, 2) ≃ PSp(4, 3), between a projective special unitary group and a projective symplectic group.

==== Action on projective line ====
Some of the above maps can be seen directly in terms of the action of PSL and PGL on the associated projective line: PGL(n, q) acts on the projective space P^{n−1}(q), which has (q^{n} − 1)/(q − 1) points, and this yields a map from the projective linear group to the symmetric group on (q^{n} − 1)/(q − 1) points. For n = 2, this is the projective line P^{1}(q) which has (q^{2} − 1)/(q − 1) = q + 1 points, so there is a map PGL(2, q) → S_{q+1}.

To understand these maps, it is useful to recall these facts:

- The order of PGL(2, q) is
  (q^{2} − 1)(q^{2} − q)/(q − 1) = q^{3} − q = (q − 1)q(q + 1);

the order of PSL(2, q) either equals this (if the characteristic is 2), or is half this (if the characteristic is not 2).

- The action of the projective linear group on the projective line is sharply 3-transitive (faithful and 3-transitive), so the map is one-to-one and has image a 3-transitive subgroup.

Thus the image is a 3-transitive subgroup of known order, which allows it to be identified. This yields the following maps:

- PSL(2, 2) = PGL(2, 2) → S_{3}, of order 6, which is an isomorphism.
  - The inverse map (a projective representation of S_{3}) can be realized by the anharmonic group, and more generally yields an embedding S_{3} → PGL(2, q) for all fields.
- PSL(2, 3) < PGL(2, 3) → S_{4}, of orders 12 and 24, the latter of which is an isomorphism, with PSL(2, 3) being the alternating group.
  - The anharmonic group gives a partial map in the opposite direction, mapping S_{3} → PGL(2, 3) as the stabilizer of the point −1.
- PSL(2, 4) = PGL(2, 4) → S_{5}, of order 60, yielding the alternating group A_{5}.
- PSL(2, 5) < PGL(2, 5) → S_{6}, of orders 60 and 120, which yields an embedding of S_{5} (respectively, A_{5}) as a transitive subgroup of S_{6} (respectively, A_{6}). This is an example of an exotic map S_{5} → S_{6}, and can be used to construct the exceptional outer automorphism of S_{6}. The isomorphism PGL(2, 5) ≅ S_{5} is not transparent from this presentation: there is no particularly natural set of 5 elements on which PGL(2, 5) acts.

==== Action on p points ====
While PSL(n, q) naturally acts on (q^{n} − 1)/(q − 1) = 1 + q + ... + q^{n−1} points, non-trivial actions on fewer points are rarer. Indeed, for PSL(2, p) acts non-trivially on p points if and only if p = 2, 3, 5, 7, or 11; for 2 and 3 the group is not simple, while for 5, 7, and 11, the group is simple – further, it does not act non-trivially on fewer than p points. (Note: Since p divides the order of the group, the group does not embed in (or, since simple, map non-trivially to) S_{k} for k < p, as p does not divide the order of this latter group.) This was first observed by Évariste Galois in his last letter to Chevalier, 1832.

This can be analyzed as follows; for 2 and 3 the action is not faithful (it is a non-trivial quotient, and the PSL group is not simple), while for 5, 7, and 11 the action is faithful (as the group is simple and the action is non-trivial), and yields an embedding into S_{p}. In all but the last case, PSL(2, 11), it corresponds to an exceptional isomorphism, where the right-most group has an obvious action on p points:

- L_{2}(2) ≅ S_{3} $\twoheadrightarrow$ S_{2} via the sign map;
- L_{2}(3) ≅ A_{4} $\twoheadrightarrow$ A_{3} ≅ C_{3} via the quotient by the Klein 4-group;
- L_{2}(5) ≅ A_{5}. To construct such an isomorphism, one needs to consider the group L_{2}(5) as a Galois group of a Galois cover a_{5}: X(5) → X(1) = P^{1}, where X(N) is a modular curve of level N. This cover is ramified at 12 points. The modular curve X(5) has genus 0 and is isomorphic to a sphere over the field of complex numbers, and then the action of L_{2}(5) on these 12 points becomes the symmetry group of an icosahedron. One then needs to consider the action of the symmetry group of icosahedron on the five associated tetrahedra.
- L_{2}(7) ≅ L_{3}(2) which acts on the 1 + 2 + 4 = 7 points of the Fano plane (projective plane over F_{2}); this can also be seen as the action on order 2 biplane, which is the complementary Fano plane.
- L_{2}(11) is subtler, and elaborated below; it acts on the order 3 biplane.

Further, L_{2}(7) and L_{2}(11) have two inequivalent actions on p points; geometrically this is realized by the action on a biplane, which has p points and p blocks – the action on the points and the action on the blocks are both actions on p points, but not conjugate (they have different point stabilizers); they are instead related by an outer automorphism of the group.

More recently, these last three exceptional actions have been interpreted as an example of the ADE classification: these actions correspond to products (as sets, not as groups) of the groups as A_{4} × Z / 5Z, S_{4} × Z / 7Z, and A_{5} × Z / 11Z, where the groups A_{4}, S_{4} and A_{5} are the isometry groups of the Platonic solids, and correspond to E_{6}, E_{7}, and E_{8} under the McKay correspondence. These three exceptional cases are also realized as the geometries of polyhedra (equivalently, tilings of Riemann surfaces), respectively: the compound of five tetrahedra inside the icosahedron (sphere, genus 0), the order 2 biplane (complementary Fano plane) inside the Klein quartic (genus 3), and the order 3 biplane (Paley biplane) inside the buckyball surface (genus 70).

The action of L_{2}(11) can be seen algebraically as due to an exceptional inclusion L_{2}(5) $\hookrightarrow$ L_{2}(11) – there are two conjugacy classes of subgroups of L_{2}(11) that are isomorphic to L_{2}(5), each with 11 elements: the action of L_{2}(11) by conjugation on these is an action on 11 points, and, further, the two conjugacy classes are related by an outer automorphism of L_{2}(11). (The same is true for subgroups of L_{2}(7) isomorphic to S_{4}, and this also has a biplane geometry.)

Geometrically, this action can be understood via a biplane geometry, which is defined as follows. A biplane geometry is a symmetric design (a set of points and an equal number of "lines", or rather blocks) such that any set of two points is contained in two lines, while any two lines intersect in two points; this is similar to a finite projective plane, except that rather than two points determining one line (and two lines determining one point), they determine two lines (respectively, points). In this case (the Paley biplane, obtained from the Paley digraph of order 11), the points are the affine line (the finite field) F_{11}, where the first line is defined to be the five non-zero quadratic residues (points which are squares: 1, 3, 4, 5, 9), and the other lines are the affine translates of this (add a constant to all the points). L_{2}(11) is then isomorphic to the subgroup of S_{11} that preserve this geometry (sends lines to lines), giving a set of 11 points on which it acts – in fact two: the points or the lines, which corresponds to the outer automorphism – while L_{2}(5) is the stabilizer of a given line, or dually of a given point.

More surprisingly, the coset space L_{2}(11) / (Z / 11Z), which has order 660/11 = 60 (and on which the icosahedral group acts) naturally has the structure of a buckeyball, which is used in the construction of the buckyball surface.

=== Mathieu groups ===
The group PSL(3, 4) can be used to construct the Mathieu group M_{24}, one of the sporadic simple groups; in this context, one refers to PSL(3, 4) as M_{21}, though it is not properly a Mathieu group itself. One begins with the projective plane over the field with four elements, which is a Steiner system of type S(2, 5, 21) – meaning that it has 21 points, each line ("block", in Steiner terminology) has 5 points, and any 2 points determine a line – and on which PSL(3, 4) acts. One calls this Steiner system W_{21} ("W" for Witt), and then expands it to a larger Steiner system W_{24}, expanding the symmetry group along the way: to the projective general linear group PGL(3, 4), then to the projective semilinear group PΓL(3, 4), and finally to the Mathieu group M_{24}.

M_{24} also contains copies of PSL(2, 11), which is maximal in M_{22}, and PSL(2, 23), which is maximal in M_{24}, and can be used to construct M_{24}.

=== Hurwitz surfaces ===
Some PSL groups arise as automorphism groups of Hurwitz surfaces, i.e., as quotients of the (2,3,7) triangle group, which is the symmetries of the order-3 bisected heptagonal tiling.

PSL groups arise as Hurwitz groups (automorphism groups of Hurwitz surfaces – algebraic curves of maximal possibly symmetry group). The Hurwitz surface of lowest genus, the Klein quartic (genus 3), has automorphism group isomorphic to PSL(2, 7) (equivalently GL(3, 2)), while the Hurwitz surface of second-lowest genus, the Macbeath surface (genus 7), has automorphism group isomorphic to PSL(2, 8).

In fact, many but not all simple groups arise as Hurwitz groups (including the monster group, though not all alternating groups or sporadic groups), though PSL is notable for including the smallest such groups.

=== Modular group ===
The groups PSL(2, Z / nZ) arise in studying the modular group, PSL(2, Z), as quotients by reducing all elements mod n; the kernels are called the principal congruence subgroups.

A noteworthy subgroup of the projective general linear group PGL(2, Z) (and of the projective special linear group PSL(2, Z[i])) is the symmetries of the set {0, 1, ∞} ⊂ P^{1}(C) (Note: In projective coordinates, the points {0, 1, ∞} are given by [0:1], [1:1], and [1:0], which explains why their stabilizer is represented by integral matrices.) which is known as the anharmonic group, and arises as the symmetries of the six cross-ratios. The subgroup can be expressed as fractional linear transformations, or represented (non-uniquely) by matrices, as:

$x$	$1/(1-x)$	$(x-1)/x$
$$\begin{pmatrix} 1 & 0\\ 0 & 1 \end{pmatrix}$$	$$\begin{pmatrix} 0 & 1\\ -1 & 1 \end{pmatrix}$$	$$\begin{pmatrix} 1 & -1\\ 1 & 0 \end{pmatrix}$$
$1/x$	$1-x$	$x/(x-1)$
$$\begin{pmatrix} 0 & 1\\ 1 & 0 \end{pmatrix}$$	$$\begin{pmatrix} -1 & 1\\ 0 & 1 \end{pmatrix}$$	$$\begin{pmatrix} 1 & 0\\ 1 & -1 \end{pmatrix}$$
$$\begin{pmatrix} 0 & i\\ i & 0 \end{pmatrix}$$	$$\begin{pmatrix} -i & i\\ 0 & i \end{pmatrix}$$	$$\begin{pmatrix} i & 0\\ i & -i \end{pmatrix}$$

The top row is the identity and the two 3-cycles, and are orientation-preserving, forming a subgroup in PSL(2, Z), while the bottom row is the three 2-cycles, and are in PGL(2, Z) and PSL(2, Z[i]), but not in PSL(2, Z), hence realized either as matrices with determinant −1 and integer coefficients, or as matrices with determinant 1 and Gaussian integer coefficients.

This maps to the symmetries of {0, 1, ∞} ⊂ P^{1}(n) under reduction mod n. Notably, for n = 2, this subgroup maps isomorphically to PGL(2, Z / 2Z) = PSL(2, Z / 2Z) ≅ S_{3}, (Note: This isomorphism can be seen by removing the minus signs in matrices, which yields the matrices for PGL(2, 2)) and thus provides a splitting PGL(2, Z / 2Z) $\hookrightarrow$ PGL(2, Z) for the quotient map PGL(2, Z) $\twoheadrightarrow$ PGL(2, Z / 2Z).

The subgroups of the stabilizer of {0, 1, ∞} further stabilize the points {−1, 1/2, 2} and {ζ_{−}, ζ_{+}}.

The fixed points of both 3-cycles are the "most symmetric" cross-ratios, $e^{\pm i\pi/3} = \tfrac{1}{2} \pm \tfrac{\sqrt{3}}{2}i$, the solutions to x^{2} − x + 1 (the primitive sixth roots of unity). The 2-cycles interchange these, as they do any points other than their fixed points, which realizes the quotient map S_{3} → S_{2} by the group action on these two points. That is, the subgroup C_{3} < S_{3} consisting of the identity and the 3-cycles, {(), (0 1 ∞), (0 ∞ 1)}, fixes these two points, while the other elements interchange them.

The fixed points of the individual 2-cycles are, respectively, −1, 1/2, 2, and this set is also preserved and permuted by the 3-cycles. This corresponds to the action of S_{3} on the 2-cycles (its Sylow 2-subgroups) by conjugation and realizes the isomorphism with the group of inner automorphisms, S_{3} Inn(S_{3}) ≅ S_{3}.

Geometrically, this can be visualized as the rotation group of the triangular bipyramid, which is isomorphic to the dihedral group of the triangle D_{3} ≅ S_{3}; see anharmonic group.

== Topology ==
Over the real and complex numbers, the topology of PGL and PSL can be determined from the fiber bundles that define them:

$$\begin{matrix}
\mathrm{ Z} &\cong& K^\times &\to& \mathrm{GL} &\to& \mathrm{PGL} \\
\mathrm{SZ} &\cong& \mu_n &\to& \mathrm{SL} &\to& \mathrm{PSL}
\end{matrix}$$

via the long exact sequence of a fibration.

For both the reals and complexes, SL is a covering space of PSL, with number of sheets equal to the number of nth roots in K; thus in particular all their higher homotopy groups agree. For the reals, SL is a 2-fold cover of PSL for n even, and is a 1-fold cover for n odd, i.e., an isomorphism:

{±1} → SL(2n, R) → PSL(2n, R)
SL(2n + 1, R) PSL(2n + 1, R)

For the complexes, SL is an n-fold cover of PSL.

For PGL, for the reals, the fiber is R^{×} ≅ {±1}, so up to homotopy, GL → PGL is a 2-fold covering space, and all higher homotopy groups agree.

For PGL over the complexes, the fiber is C^{×} ≅ S^{1}, so up to homotopy, GL → PGL is a circle bundle. The higher homotopy groups of the circle vanish, so the homotopy groups of GL(n, C) and PGL(n, C) agree for n ≥ 3. In fact, π_{2} always vanishes for Lie groups, so the homotopy groups agree for n ≥ 2. For n = 1, π_{1}(GL(n, C)) = π_{1}(S^{1}) = Z. The fundamental group of PGL(2, C) is a finite cyclic group of order 2.

=== Covering groups ===
Over the real and complex numbers, the projective special linear groups are the minimal (centerless) Lie group realizations for the special linear Lie algebra $\mathfrak{sl}(n)\colon$ every connected Lie group whose Lie algebra is $\mathfrak{sl}(n)$ is a cover of PSL(n, F). Conversely, its universal covering group is the maximal (simply connected) element, and the intermediary realizations form a lattice of covering groups.

For example, SL(2, R) has center {±1} and fundamental group Z, and thus has universal cover S̅L̅(2̅, R̅) and covers the centerless PSL(2, R).

== Representation theory ==
A projective representation of G can be pulled back to a linear representation of a central extension C of G. K^{*} = K^{×}.

A group homomorphism G → PGL(V) from a group G to a projective linear group is called a projective representation of the group G, by analogy with a linear representation (a homomorphism G → GL(V)). These were studied by Issai Schur, who showed that projective representations of G can be classified in terms of linear representations of central extensions of G. This led to the Schur multiplier, which is used to address this question.

== Low dimensions ==
The projective linear group is mostly studied for n ≥ 2, though it can be defined for low dimensions.

For n = 0 (or in fact n < 0) the projective space of K^{0} is empty, as there are no 1-dimensional subspaces of a 0-dimensional space. Thus, PGL(0, K) is the trivial group, consisting of the unique empty map from the empty set to itself. Further, the action of scalars on a 0-dimensional space is trivial, so the map K^{×} → GL(0, K) is trivial, rather than an inclusion as it is in higher dimensions.

For n = 1, the projective space of K^{1} is a single point, as there is a single 1-dimensional subspace. Thus, PGL(1, K) is the trivial group, consisting of the unique map from a singleton set to itself. Further, the general linear group of a 1-dimensional space is exactly the scalars, so the map K^{×} GL(1, K) is an isomorphism, corresponding to PGL(1, K) := GL(1, K) / K^{×} ≅ {1} being trivial.

For n = 2, PGL(2, K) is non-trivial, but is unusual in that it is 3-transitive, unlike higher dimensions when it is only 2-transitive.

== Examples ==
- PSL(2, 7)
- Modular group, PSL(2, Z)
- PSL(2, R)
- Möbius group, PGL(2, C) = PSL(2, C)

== Subgroups ==
- Projective orthogonal group, PO – maximal compact subgroup of PGL
- Projective unitary group, PU
- Projective special orthogonal group, PSO – maximal compact subgroup of PSL
- Projective special unitary group, PSU

== Larger groups ==
The projective linear group is contained within larger groups, notably:

- Projective semilinear group, PΓL, which allows field automorphisms.
- Cremona group, Cr(P^{n}(k)) of birational automorphisms; any biregular automorphism is linear, so PGL coincides with the group of biregular automorphisms.

== See also ==
- Projective transformation
- Unit
