= Automorphisms of the symmetric and alternating groups =

Aspect of mathematical group theory

In group theory, a branch of mathematics, the automorphisms and outer automorphisms of the symmetric groups and alternating groups are both standard examples of these automorphisms, and objects of study in their own right, particularly the exceptional outer automorphism of S_{6}, the symmetric group on 6 elements.

== Summary ==
$n$	$\operatorname{Aut}(\mathrm{S}_n)$	$\operatorname{Out}(\mathrm{S}_n)$
$n\neq 2,6$	$\mathrm{S}_n$	$\mathrm{C}_1$
$n=2$	$\mathrm{C}_1$	$\mathrm{C}_1$
$n=6$	$\mathrm{S}_6 \rtimes \mathrm{C}_2$	$\mathrm{C}_2$

$n$	$\operatorname{Aut}(\mathrm{A}_n)$	$\operatorname{Out}(\mathrm{A}_n)$
$n\geq 4, n\neq 6$	$\mathrm{S}_n$	$\mathrm{C}_2$
$n=1,2$	$\mathrm{C}_1$	$\mathrm{C}_1$
$n=3$	$\mathrm{C}_2$	$\mathrm{C}_2$
$n=6$	$\mathrm{S}_6 \rtimes \mathrm{C}_2$	$\mathrm{V}=\mathrm{C}_2 \times \mathrm{C}_2$

=== Notations ===
We use the following notations:

- $\mathrm{S}_n$: The symmetric group of order $n$
- $\mathrm{A}_n$: The alternating group of order $n$
- $\operatorname{Aut}(G)$: The group of automorphisms of group $G$
- $\operatorname{Out}(G)$: The group of outer automorphisms of group $G$

=== Generic case ===
- $n\neq 2,6$: $\operatorname{Aut}(\mathrm{S}_n) = \mathrm{S}_n$, and thus $\operatorname{Out}(\mathrm{S}_n) = \mathrm{C}_1$.

Formally, $\mathrm{S}_n$ is complete and the natural map $\mathrm{S}_n \to \operatorname{Aut}(\mathrm{S}_n)$ is an isomorphism.

- $n\neq 1,2,6$: $\operatorname{Out}(\mathrm{A}_n)=\mathrm{S}_n/\mathrm{A}_n=\mathrm{C}_2$, and the outer automorphism is conjugation by an odd permutation.
- $n\neq 2,3,6$: $\operatorname{Aut}(\mathrm{A}_n)=\operatorname{Aut}(\mathrm{S}_n)=\mathrm{S}_n$

Indeed, the natural maps $\mathrm{S}_n \to \operatorname{Aut}(\mathrm{S}_n) \to \operatorname{Aut}(\mathrm{A}_n)$ are isomorphisms.

=== Exceptional cases ===
- $n=1,2$: trivial:

$$\operatorname{Aut}(\mathrm{S}_1)=\operatorname{Out}(\mathrm{S}_1)=\operatorname{Aut}(\mathrm{A}_1)=\operatorname{Out}(\mathrm{A}_1)=\mathrm{C}_1$$
$$\operatorname{Aut}(\mathrm{S}_2)=\operatorname{Out}(\mathrm{S}_2)=\operatorname{Aut}(\mathrm{A}_2)=\operatorname{Out}(\mathrm{A}_2)=\mathrm{C}_1$$

- $n=3$: $\operatorname{Aut}(\mathrm{A}_3)=\operatorname{Out}(\mathrm{A}_3)=\mathrm{S}_3/\mathrm{A}_3=\mathrm{C}_2$
- $n=6$: $\operatorname{Out}(\mathrm{S}_6)=\mathrm{C}_2$, and $\operatorname{Aut}(\mathrm{S}_6)=\mathrm{S}_6 \rtimes \mathrm{C}_2$ is a semidirect product.
- $n=6$: $\operatorname{Out}(\mathrm{A}_6)=\mathrm{C}_2 \times \mathrm{C}_2$, and $\operatorname{Aut}(\mathrm{A}_6)=\operatorname{Aut}(\mathrm{S}_6)=\mathrm{S}_6 \rtimes \mathrm{C}_2.$

== The exceptional outer automorphism of S_{6} ==
Among symmetric groups, only S_{6} has a non-trivial outer automorphism, which one can call exceptional (in analogy with exceptional Lie algebras) or exotic. In fact, Out(S_{6}) = C_{2}.

This was discovered by Otto Hölder in 1895.

The specific nature of the outer automorphism is as follows. The 360 permutations in the even subgroup (A_{6}) are transformed amongst themselves:

- the sole identity permutation maps to itself;
- a 3-cycle such as (1 2 3) maps to the product of two 3-cycles such as (1 4 5)(2 6 3) and vice versa, accounting for 40 permutations each way;
- a 5-cycle such as (1 2 3 4 5) maps to another 5-cycle such as (1 3 6 5 2), accounting for 144 permutations;
- the product of two 2-cycles such as (1 2)(3 4) maps to another product of two 2-cycles such as (3 5)(4 6), accounting for 45 permutations;
- the product of a 2-cycle and a 4-cycle such as (1 2 3 4)(5 6) maps to another such permutation such as (1 4 2 6)(3 5), accounting for the 90 remaining permutations.

And the odd part is also conserved:

- a 2-cycle such as (1 2) maps to the product of three 2-cycles such as (1 2)(3 4)(5 6) and vice versa, there being 15 permutations each way;
- the product of a 2-cycle and a 3-cycle such as (1 2 3)(4 5) maps to a 6-cycle such as (1 2 5 3 4 6) and vice versa, accounting for 120 permutations each way;
- a 4-cycle such as (1 2 3 4) maps to another 4-cycle such as (1 6 2 4), accounting for the 90 remaining permutations.

Thus, all 720 permutations on 6 elements are accounted for. The outer automorphism does not preserve cycle structure in general, mapping some single cycles to the product of two or three cycles and vice versa.

This also yields another outer automorphism of A_{6}, and this is the only exceptional outer automorphism of a finite simple group: for the infinite families of simple groups, there are formulas for the number of outer automorphisms, and the simple group of order 360, thought of as A_{6}, would be expected to have two outer automorphisms, not four. However, when A_{6} is viewed as PSL(2, 9) the outer automorphism group has the expected order. (For sporadic groups – i.e. those not falling in an infinite family – the notion of exceptional outer automorphism is ill-defined, as there is no general formula.)

=== Construction ===
There are numerous constructions, listed in (Janusz & Rotman 1982).

Note that as an outer automorphism, it is a class of automorphisms, well-determined only up to an inner automorphism, hence there is not a natural one to write down.

One method is:

- Construct an exotic map (embedding) S_{5} → S_{6}; see below
- S_{6} acts by conjugation on the six conjugates of this subgroup, yielding a map S_{6} → S_{X}, where X is the set of conjugates. Identifying X with the numbers 1, ..., 6 (which depends on a choice of numbering of the conjugates, i.e., up to an element of S_{6} (an inner automorphism)) yields an outer automorphism S_{6} → S_{6}.
- This map is an outer automorphism, since a transposition does not map to a transposition, but inner automorphisms preserve cycle structure.

Throughout the following, one can work with the multiplication action on cosets or the conjugation action on conjugates.

To see that S_{6} has an outer automorphism, recall that homomorphisms from a group G to a symmetric group S_{n} are essentially the same as actions of G on a set of n elements, and the subgroup fixing a point is then a subgroup of index at most n in G. Conversely if we have a subgroup of index n in G, the action on the cosets gives a transitive action of G on n points, and therefore a homomorphism to S_{n}.

=== Construction from graph partitions ===
Before the more mathematically rigorous constructions, it helps to understand a simple construction.

Take a complete graph with 6 vertices, K_{6}. It has 15 edges, which can be partitioned into perfect matchings in 15 different ways, each perfect matching being a set of three edges no two of which share a vertex. It is possible to find a set of 5 perfect matchings from the set of 15 such that no two matchings share an edge, and that between them include all 5 × 3 = 15 edges of the graph; this graph factorization can be done in 6 different ways.

Consider a permutation of the 6 vertices, and see its effect on the 6 different factorizations. We get a map from 720 input permutations to 720 output permutations. That map is precisely the outer automorphism of S_{6}.

Being an automorphism, the map must preserve the order of elements, but unlike inner automorphisms, it does not preserve cycle structure, thereby indicating that it must be an outer automorphism. For instance, a 2-cycle maps to a product of three 2-cycles; it is easy to see that a 2-cycle affects all of the 6 graph factorizations in some way, and hence has no fixed points when viewed as a permutation of factorizations. The fact that it is possible to construct this automorphism at all relies on a large number of numerical coincidences which apply only to n = 6.

=== Exotic map S_{5} → S_{6} ===
There is a subgroup (indeed, 6 conjugate subgroups) of S_{6} which is abstractly isomorphic to S_{5}, but which acts transitively as a subgroup of S_{6} on a set of 6 elements. (The image of the obvious map S_{n} → S_{n+1} fixes an element and thus is not transitive.)

==== Sylow 5-subgroups ====
Janusz and Rotman construct it thus:

- S_{5} acts transitively by conjugation on the set of its 6 Sylow 5-subgroups, yielding an embedding S_{5} → S_{6} as a transitive subgroup of order 120.

This follows from inspection of 5-cycles: each 5-cycle generates a group of order 5 (thus a Sylow subgroup), there are 5!/5 = 120/5 = 24 5-cycles, yielding 6 subgroups (as each subgroup also includes the identity), and S_{n} acts transitively by conjugation on the set of cycles of a given class, hence transitively by conjugation on these subgroups.

Alternately, one could use the Sylow theorems, which state generally that all Sylow p-subgroups are conjugate.

==== PGL(2,5) ====
The projective linear group of dimension two over the finite field with five elements, PGL(2, 5), acts on the projective line over the field with five elements, P^{1}(F_{5}), which has six elements. Further, this action is faithful and 3-transitive, as is always the case for the action of the projective linear group on the projective line. This yields a map PGL(2, 5) → S_{6} as a transitive subgroup. Identifying PGL(2, 5) with S_{5} and the projective special linear group PSL(2, 5) with A_{5} yields the desired exotic maps S_{5} → S_{6} and A_{5} → A_{6}.

Following the same philosophy, one can realize the outer automorphism as the following two inequivalent actions of S_{6} on a set with six elements:

- the usual action as a permutation group;
- the six inequivalent structures of an abstract 6-element set as the projective line P^{1}(F_{5}) – the line has 6 points, and the projective linear group acts 3-transitively, so fixing 3 of the points, there are 3! = 6 different ways to arrange the remaining 3 points, which yields the desired alternative action.

==== Frobenius group ====
Another way: To construct an outer automorphism of S_{6}, we need to construct an "unusual" subgroup of index 6 in S_{6}, in other words one that is not one of the six obvious S_{5} subgroups fixing a point (which just correspond to inner automorphisms of S_{6}).

The Frobenius group of affine transformations of F_{5} (maps $x \mapsto ax+b$ where a ≠ 0) has order 20 = (5 − 1) · 5 and acts on the field with 5 elements, hence is a subgroup of S_{5}. (Indeed, it is the normalizer of a Sylow 5-group mentioned above, thought of as the order-5 group of translations of F_{5}.)

S_{5} acts transitively on the coset space, which is a set of 120/20 = 6 elements (or by conjugation, which yields the action above).

=== Other constructions ===
Ernst Witt found a copy of Aut(S_{6}) in the Mathieu group M_{12} (a subgroup T isomorphic to S_{6} and an element σ that normalizes T and acts by outer automorphism). Similarly to S_{6} acting on a set of 6 elements in 2 different ways (having an outer automorphism), M_{12} acts on a set of 12 elements in 2 different ways (has an outer automorphism), though since M_{12} is itself exceptional, one does not consider this outer automorphism to be exceptional itself.

The full automorphism group of A_{6} appears naturally as a maximal subgroup of the Mathieu group M_{12} in 2 ways, as either a subgroup fixing a division of the 12 points into a pair of 6-element sets, or as a subgroup fixing a subset of 2 points.

Another way to see that S_{6} has a nontrivial outer automorphism is to use the fact that A_{6} is isomorphic to PSL_{2}(9), whose automorphism group is the projective semilinear group PΓL_{2}(9), in which PSL_{2}(9) is of index 4, yielding an outer automorphism group of order 4. The most visual way to see this automorphism is to give an interpretation via algebraic geometry over finite fields, as follows. Consider the action of S_{6} on affine 6-space over the field k with 3 elements. This action preserves several things: the hyperplane H on which the coordinates sum to 0, the line L in H where all coordinates coincide, and the quadratic form q given by the sum of the squares of all 6 coordinates. The restriction of q to H has defect line L, so there is an induced quadratic form Q on the 4-dimensional H/L that one checks is non-degenerate and non-split. The zero scheme of Q in H/L defines a smooth quadric surface X in the associated projective 3-space over k. Over an algebraic closure of k, X is a product of two projective lines, so by a descent argument X is the Weil restriction to k of the projective line over a quadratic étale algebra K. Since Q is not split over k, an auxiliary argument with special orthogonal groups over k forces K to be a field (rather than a product of two copies of k). The natural S_{6}-action on everything in sight defines a map from S_{6} to the k-automorphism group of X, which is the semi-direct product G of PGL_{2}(K) = PGL_{2}(9) against the Galois involution. This map carries the simple group A_{6} nontrivially into (hence onto) the subgroup PSL_{2}(9) of index 4 in the semi-direct product G, so S_{6} is thereby identified as an index-2 subgroup of G (namely, the subgroup of G generated by PSL_{2}(9) and the Galois involution). Conjugation by any element of G outside of S_{6} defines the nontrivial outer automorphism of S_{6}.

=== Structure of outer automorphism ===
On cycles, it exchanges permutations of type (12) with (12)(34)(56) (class 2^{1} with class 2^{3}), and of type (123) with (145)(263) (class 3^{1} with class 3^{2}). The outer automorphism also exchanges permutations of type (12)(345) with (123456) (class 2^{1}3^{1} with class 6^{1}). For each of the other cycle types in S_{6}, the outer automorphism fixes the class of permutations of the cycle type.

On A_{6}, it interchanges the 3-cycles (like (123)) with elements of class 3^{2} (like (123)(456)).

== No other outer automorphisms ==
To see that none of the other symmetric groups have outer automorphisms, it is easiest to proceed in two steps:

1. First, show that any automorphism that preserves the conjugacy class of transpositions is an inner automorphism. (This also shows that the outer automorphism of S_{6} is unique; see below.) Note that an automorphism must send each conjugacy class (characterized by the cyclic structure that its elements share) to a (possibly different) conjugacy class.
2. Second, show that every automorphism (other than the above for S_{6}) stabilizes the class of transpositions.

The latter can be shown in two ways:

- For every symmetric group other than S_{6}, there is no other conjugacy class consisting of elements of order 2 that has the same number of elements as the class of transpositions.
- Or as follows:

Each permutation of order two (called an involution) is a product of k > 0 disjoint transpositions, so that it has cyclic structure 2^{k}1^{n−2k}. What is special about the class of transpositions (k = 1)?

If one forms the product of two distinct transpositions τ_{1} and τ_{2}, then one always obtains either a 3-cycle or a permutation of type 2^{2}1^{n−4}, so the order of the produced element is either 2 or 3. On the other hand, if one forms the product of two distinct involutions σ_{1}, σ_{2} of type k > 1, then provided n ≥ 7, it is always possible to produce an element of order 6, 7 or 4, as follows. We can arrange that the product contains either

- two 2-cycles and a 3-cycle (for k = 2 and n ≥ 7)
- a 7-cycle (for k = 3 and n ≥ 7)
- two 4-cycles (for k = 4 and n ≥ 8)

For k ≥ 5, adjoin to the permutations σ_{1}, σ_{2} of the last example redundant 2-cycles that cancel each other, and we still get two 4-cycles.

Now we arrive at a contradiction, because if the class of transpositions is sent via the automorphism f to a class of involutions that has k > 1, then there exist two transpositions τ_{1}, τ_{2} such that f(τ_{1}) f(τ_{2}) has order 6, 7 or 4, but we know that τ_{1}τ_{2} has order 2 or 3.

=== No other outer automorphisms of S_{6} ===
S_{6} has exactly one (class) of outer automorphisms: Out(S_{6}) = C_{2}.

To see this, observe that there are only two conjugacy classes of S_{6} of size 15: the transpositions and those of class 2^{3}. Each element of Aut(S_{6}) either preserves each of these conjugacy classes, or exchanges them. Any representative of the outer automorphism constructed above exchanges the conjugacy classes, whereas an index 2 subgroup stabilizes the transpositions. But an automorphism that stabilizes the transpositions is inner, so the inner automorphisms form an index 2 subgroup of Aut(S_{6}), so Out(S_{6}) = C_{2}.

More pithily: an automorphism that stabilizes transpositions is inner, and there are only two conjugacy classes of order 15 (transpositions and triple transpositions), hence the outer automorphism group is at most order 2.

== Small n ==
=== Symmetric ===
For n = 2, S_{2} = C_{2} = Z/2 and the automorphism group is trivial (obviously, but more formally because Aut(Z/2) = GL(1, Z/2) = Z/2^{*} = C_{1}). The inner automorphism group is thus also trivial (also because S_{2} is abelian).

=== Alternating ===
For n = 1 and 2, A_{1} = A_{2} = C_{1} is trivial, so the automorphism group is also trivial. For n = 3, A_{3} = C_{3} = Z/3 is abelian (and cyclic): the automorphism group is GL(1, Z/3^{*}) = C_{2}, and the inner automorphism group is trivial (because it is abelian).
