= Complete group =

In mathematics, a group G is said to be complete if every automorphism of G is inner, and it is centerless; that is, it has a trivial outer automorphism group and trivial center.

Equivalently, a group is complete if the conjugation map, G → Aut(G) (sending an element g to conjugation by g), is an isomorphism: injectivity implies that only conjugation by the identity element is the identity automorphism, meaning the group is centerless, while surjectivity implies it has no outer automorphisms.

== Examples ==
As an example, all the symmetric groups, S_{n}, are complete except when n ∈ {2, 6}. For the case n = 2, the group has a non-trivial center, while for the case n = 6, there is an outer automorphism.

The automorphism group of a simple group is an almost simple group; for a non-abelian simple group G, the automorphism group of G is complete.

== Properties ==
A complete group is always isomorphic to its automorphism group (via sending an element to conjugation by that element), although the converse need not hold: for example, the dihedral group of 8 elements is isomorphic to its automorphism group, but it is not complete. For a discussion, see (Robinson 1996, section 13.5).

== Extensions of complete groups ==
Assume that a group G is a group extension given as a short exact sequence of groups

1 ⟶ N ⟶ G ⟶ G′ ⟶ 1

with kernel, N, and quotient, G′. If the kernel, N, is a complete group then the extension splits: G is isomorphic to the direct product, N × G′. A proof using homomorphisms and exact sequences can be given in a natural way: The action of G (by conjugation) on the normal subgroup, N, gives rise to a group homomorphism, φ : G → Aut(N) ≅ N. Since Out(N) = 1 and N has trivial center the homomorphism φ is surjective and has an obvious section given by the inclusion of N in G. The kernel of φ is the centralizer C_{G}(N) of N in G, and so G is at least a semidirect product, C_{G}(N) ⋊ N, but the action of N on C_{G}(N) is trivial, and so the product is direct.

This can be restated in terms of elements and internal conditions: If N is a normal, complete subgroup of a group G, then G = C_{G}(N) × N is a direct product. The proof follows directly from the definition: N is centerless giving C_{G}(N) ∩ N is trivial. If g is an element of G then it induces an automorphism of N by conjugation, but N = Aut(N) and this conjugation must be equal to conjugation by some element n of N. Then conjugation by gn^{−1} is the identity on N and so gn^{−1} is in C_{G}(N) and every element, g, of G is a product (gn^{−1})n in C_{G}(N)N.
