= Projective orthogonal group =

In projective geometry and linear algebra, the projective orthogonal group PO is the induced action of the orthogonal group of a quadratic space V = (V,Q) (Note: A quadratic space is a vector space V together with a quadratic form Q; the Q is dropped from notation when it is clear.) on the associated projective space P(V). Explicitly, the projective orthogonal group is the quotient group

PO(V) = O(V)/ZO(V) = O(V)/{±I}

where O(V) is the orthogonal group of (V) and ZO(V)={±I} is the subgroup of all orthogonal scalar transformations of V – these consist of the identity and reflection through the origin. These scalars are quotiented out because they act trivially on the projective space and they form the kernel of the action, and the notation "Z" is because the scalar transformations are the center of the orthogonal group.

The projective special orthogonal group, PSO, is defined analogously, as the induced action of the special orthogonal group on the associated projective space. Explicitly:

PSO(V) = SO(V)/ZSO(V)

where SO(V) is the special orthogonal group over V and ZSO(V) is the subgroup of orthogonal scalar transformations with unit determinant. Here ZSO is the center of SO, and is trivial in odd dimension, while it equals {±1} in even dimension – this odd/even distinction occurs throughout the structure of the orthogonal groups. By analogy with GL/SL and GO/SO, the projective orthogonal group is also sometimes called the projective general orthogonal group and denoted PGO.

Like the orthogonal group, the projective orthogonal group can be defined over any field and with varied quadratic forms, though, as with the ordinary orthogonal group, the main emphasis is on the real positive definite projective orthogonal group; other fields are elaborated in generalizations, below. Except when mentioned otherwise, in the sequel PO and PSO will refer to the real positive definite groups.

Like the spin groups and pin groups, which are covers rather than quotients of the (special) orthogonal groups, the projective (special) orthogonal groups are of interest for (projective) geometric analogs of Euclidean geometry, as related Lie groups, and in representation theory.

More intrinsically, the (real positive definite) projective orthogonal group PO can be defined as the isometries of elliptic space (in the sense of elliptic geometry), while PSO can be defined as the orientation-preserving isometries of elliptic space (when the space is orientable; otherwise PSO = PO).

== Structure ==
=== Odd and even dimensions ===

The structure of PO differs significantly between odd and even dimension, fundamentally because in even dimension, reflection through the origin is orientation-preserving, while in odd dimension it is orientation-reversing ($-I \in \operatorname{SO}(2k)$ but $-I \not\in \operatorname{SO}(2k+1)$). This is seen in the fact that each odd-dimensional real projective space is orientable, while each even-dimensional real projective space of positive dimension is non-orientable. At a more abstract level, the Lie algebras of odd- and even-dimensional projective orthogonal groups form two different families: $B_k = \mathfrak{so}_{2k+1}, D_k = \mathfrak{so}_{2k}.$

Thus, O(2k+1) = SO(2k+1) × {±I}, (Note: This product is an internal direct sum – a product of subgroups – not just an abstract external direct sum.) while $\operatorname{O}(2k) \neq \operatorname{SO}(2k) \times \{\pm I\}$ and is instead a non-trivial central extension of PO(2k).

Beware that PO(2k+1) is isometries of RP^{2k} = P(R^{2k+1}), while PO(2k) is isometries of RP^{2k−1} = P(R^{2k}) – the odd-dimensional (vector) group is isometries of even-dimensional projective space, while the even-dimensional (vector) group is isometries of odd-dimensional projective space.

In odd dimension, $\operatorname{SO}(2k+1) \cong \operatorname{PSO}(2k+1) = \operatorname{PO}(2k+1),$ (Note: The isomorphism/equality distinction in this equation is because the context is the 2-to-1 quotient map O → PO – PSO(2k+1) and PO(2k+1) are equal subsets of the target (namely, the whole space), hence the equality, while the induced map SO → PSO is an isomorphism but the two groups are subsets of different spaces, hence the isomorphism rather than an equality. See (Conway & Smith 2003, p. 34) for an example of this distinction being made.) so the group of projective isometries can be identified with the group of rotational isometries.

In even dimension, SO(2k) → PSO(2k) and O(2k) → PO(2k) are both 2-to-1 covers, and PSO(2k) < PO(2k) is an index 2 subgroup.

=== General properties ===
PSO and PO are centerless, as with PSL and PGL; this is because scalar matrices are not only the center of SO and O, but also the hypercenter (quotient by the center does not always yield a centerless group).

PSO is the maximal compact subgroup in the projective special linear group PSL, while PO is maximal compact in the projective general linear group PGL. This is analogous to SO being maximal compact in SL and O being maximal compact in GL.

== Representation theory ==
PO is of basic interest in representation theory: a group homomorphism G → PGL is called a projective representation of G, just as a map G → GL is called a linear representation of G, and just as any linear representation can be reduced to a map G → O (by taking an invariant inner product), any projective representation can be reduced to a map G → PO.

See projective linear group: representation theory for further discussion.

== Subgroups ==
Subgroups of the projective orthogonal group correspond to subgroups of the orthogonal group that contain −I (that have central symmetry). As always with a quotient map (by the lattice theorem), there is a Galois connection between subgroups of O and PO, where the adjunction on O (given by taking the image in PO and then the preimage in O) simply adds −I if absent.

Of particular interest are discrete subgroups, which can be realized as symmetries of projective polytopes – these correspond to the (discrete) point groups that include central symmetry. Compare with discrete subgroups of the Spin group, particularly the 3-dimensional case of binary polyhedral groups.

For example, in 3 dimensions, 4 of the 5 Platonic solids have central symmetry (cube/octahedron, dodecahedron/icosahedron), while the tetrahedron does not – however, the stellated octahedron has central symmetry, though the resulting symmetry group is the same as that of the cube/octahedron.

== Topology ==
PO and PSO, as centerless topological groups, are at the bottom of a sequence of covering groups, whose top are the (simply connected) Pin groups or Spin group, respectively:

Pin_{±}(n) → O(n) → PO(n).
Spin(n) → SO(n) → PSO(n).

These groups are all compact real forms of the same Lie algebra.

These are all 2-to-1 covers, except for SO(2k+1) → PSO(2k+1) which is 1-to-1 (an isomorphism).

=== Homotopy groups ===
Homotopy groups above $\pi_1$ do not change under covers, so they agree with those of the orthogonal group. The lower homotopy groups are given as follows.

$$\pi_0(\operatorname{PSO}) \cong 1$$
$$\pi_0(\operatorname{PO}(2k)) \cong \mathbf{Z}/2\mathbf{Z}, \pi_0(\operatorname{PO}(2k+1)) \cong 1.$$

The fundamental group of (centerless) PSO(n) equals the center of (simply connected) Spin(n), which is always true about covering groups:

$$\pi_1(\operatorname{PSO}(n)) = \pi_1 (\operatorname{PO}(n)) = \operatorname{Z}(\operatorname{Spin}(n)).$$

Using the table of centers of Spin groups yields (for $k \geq 1$):

$$\pi_1 (\operatorname{PSO}(4k)) = \mathbf{Z}/2\mathbf{Z} \oplus \mathbf{Z}/2\mathbf{Z},$$
$$\pi_1 (\operatorname{PSO}(4k+2)) = \mathbf{Z}/4\mathbf{Z},$$
$$\pi_1 (\operatorname{PSO}(2k+1)) = \pi_1(\operatorname{SO}(2k+1)) = \mathbf{Z}/2\mathbf{Z},$$

In low dimensions:

$\pi_1 (\operatorname{PSO}(1)) = 1,$ as the group is trivial.
$\pi_1 (\operatorname{PSO}(2)) = \mathbf{Z},$ as it is topologically a circle, though note that the preimage of the identity in Spin(2) is $\mathbf{Z}/4\mathbf{Z},$ as for other $4k+2.$

=== Bundles ===
Just as the orthogonal group is the structure group of vector bundles, the projective orthogonal group is the structure group of projective bundles, and the corresponding classifying space is denoted BPO.

== Generalizations ==
As with the orthogonal group, the projective orthogonal group can be generalized in two main ways: changing the field or changing the quadratic form. Other than the real numbers, primary interest is in complex numbers or finite fields, while (over the reals) quadratic forms can also be indefinite forms, and are denoted PO(p,q) by their signature.

The complex projective orthogonal group, PO(n,C) should not be confused with the projective unitary group, PU(n): PO preserves a symmetric form, while PU preserves a hermitian form – PU is the symmetries of complex projective space (preserving the Fubini–Study metric).

In fields of characteristic 2 there are added complications: quadratic forms and symmetric bilinear forms are no longer equivalent, I = −I, and the determinant needs to be replaced by the Dickson invariant.

=== Finite fields ===
The projective orthogonal group over a finite field is used in the construction of a family of finite simple groups of Lie type, namely the Chevalley groups of type D_{n}. The orthogonal group over a finite field, O(n,q) is not simple, since it has SO as a subgroup and a non-trivial center ({±I}) (hence PO as quotient). These are both fixed by passing to PSO, but PSO itself is not in general simple, and instead one must use a subgroup (which may be of index 1 or 2), defined by the spinor norm (in odd characteristic) or the quasideterminant (in even characteristic). The quasideterminant can be defined as (−1)^{D}, where D is the Dickson invariant (it is the determinant defined by the Dickson invariant), or in terms of the dimension of the fixed space.

== See also ==
- Projective linear group
- Projective unitary group
- Spin group
