= Quasisimple group =

Covering group

In mathematics, a quasisimple group (also known as a covering group) is a group that is a perfect central extension E of a simple group S. In other words, there is a short exact sequence

$$1 \to Z(E) \to E \to S \to 1$$

such that $E = [E, E]$, where $Z(E)$ denotes the center of E and [ , ] denotes the commutator.

Equivalently, a group is quasisimple if it is equal to its commutator subgroup and its inner automorphism group Inn(G) (its quotient by its center) is simple (and it follows Inn(G) must be non-abelian simple, as inner automorphism groups are never non-trivial cyclic). All non-abelian simple groups are quasisimple.

The subnormal quasisimple subgroups of a group control the structure of a finite insoluble group in much the same way as the minimal normal subgroups of a finite soluble group do, and so are given a name, component.

The subgroup generated by the subnormal quasisimple subgroups is called the layer, and along with the minimal normal soluble subgroups generates a subgroup called the generalized Fitting subgroup.

The quasisimple groups are often studied alongside the simple groups and groups related to their automorphism groups, the almost simple groups. The representation theory of the quasisimple groups is nearly identical to the projective representation theory of the simple groups.

== Examples ==
The covering groups of the alternating groups are quasisimple but not simple, for $n \geq 5.$

== See also ==
- Almost simple group
- Schur multiplier
- Semisimple group
