= Semilinear map =

In linear algebra, particularly projective geometry, a semilinear map between vector spaces V and W over a field K is a function that is a linear map "up to a twist", hence semi-linear, where "twist" means "field automorphism of K". Explicitly, it is a function T : V → W that is:

- additive with respect to vector addition: $T(v+v') = T(v)+T(v')$
- there exists a field automorphism θ of K such that $T(\lambda v) = \theta(\lambda) T(v)$. If such an automorphism exists and T is nonzero, it is unique, and T is called θ-semilinear.

Where the domain and codomain are the same space (i.e. T : V → V), it may be termed a semilinear transformation. The invertible semilinear transforms of a given vector space V (for all choices of field automorphism) form a group, called the general semilinear group and denoted $\operatorname{\Gamma L}(V),$ by analogy with and extending the general linear group. The special case where the field is the complex numbers $\mathbb{C}$ and the automorphism is complex conjugation, a semilinear map is called an antilinear map.

Similar notation (replacing Latin characters with Greek ones) is used for semilinear analogs of more restricted linear transformations; formally, the semidirect product of a linear group with the Galois group of field automorphisms. For example, PΣU is used for the semilinear analogs of the projective special unitary group PSU. However, it was only recently noticed that these generalized semilinear groups are not well-defined, as pointed out in (Bray, Holt & Roney-Dougal 2009) – isomorphic classical groups G and H (subgroups of SL) may have non-isomorphic semilinear extensions. At the level of semidirect products, this corresponds to different actions of the Galois group on a given abstract group, a semidirect product depending on two groups and an action. If the extension is non-unique, there are exactly two semilinear extensions; for example, symplectic groups have a unique semilinear extension, while SU(n, q) has two extensions if n is even and q is odd, and likewise for PSU.

== Definition ==
A map f : V → W for vector spaces V and W over fields K and L respectively is σ-semilinear, or simply semilinear, if there exists a field homomorphism σ : K → L such that for all x, y in V and λ in K it holds that

1. $f(x+y)=f(x)+f(y),$
2. $f(\lambda x)=\sigma(\lambda) f(x).$

A given embedding σ of a field K in L allows us to identify K with a subfield of L, making a σ-semilinear map a K-linear map under this identification. However, a map that is τ-semilinear for a distinct embedding τ ≠ σ will not be K-linear with respect to the original identification σ, unless f is identically zero.

More generally, a map ψ : M → N between a right R-module M and a left S-module N is σ-semilinear if there exists a ring antihomomorphism σ : R → S such that for all x, y in M and λ in R it holds that

1. $\psi(x + y) = \psi(x) + \psi(y) ,$
2. $\psi(x \lambda) = \sigma(\lambda) \psi(x) .$

The term semilinear applies for any combination of left and right modules with suitable adjustment of the above expressions, with σ being a homomorphism as needed.

The pair (ψ, σ) is referred to as a dimorphism.

== Related ==
=== Transpose ===
Let $\sigma : R \to S$ be a ring isomorphism, $M$ a right $R$-module and $N$ a right $S$-module, and $\psi : M \to N$ a $\sigma$-semilinear map. Define the transpose of $\psi$ as the mapping ${}^t\psi : N^* \to M^*$ that satisfies
$$\langle y , \psi(x) \rangle = \sigma\left(\left\langle {}^\text{t} \psi(y), x \right\rangle\right) \quad \text{ for all } y \in N^*, \text{ and all } x \in M.$$
This is a $\sigma^{-1}$-semilinear map.

=== Properties ===
Let $\sigma : R \to S$ be a ring isomorphism, $M$ a right $R$-module and $N$ a right $S$-module, and $\psi : M \to N$ a $\sigma$-semilinear map. The mapping
$$M \to R : x \mapsto \sigma^{-1}(\langle y, \psi(x)\rangle), \quad y \in N^*$$
defines an $R$-linear form.

== Examples ==
- Let $K=\mathbf{C}, V=\mathbf{C}^n,$ with standard basis $e_1,\ldots, e_n$. Define the map $f\colon V \to V$ by
  $$f\left(\sum_{i=1}^n z_i e_i \right) = \sum_{i=1}^n \bar z_i e_i$$

f is semilinear (with respect to the complex conjugation field automorphism) but not linear.

- Let $K=\operatorname{GF}(q)$ – the Galois field of order $q=p^i$, p the characteristic. Let $\ell^\theta = \ell^p$. By the Freshman's dream it is known that this is a field automorphism. To every linear map $f\colon V \to W$ between vector spaces V and W over K we can establish a $\theta$-semilinear map
  $$\widetilde{f} \left( \sum_{i=1}^n \ell_i e_i\right) := f \left( \sum_{i=1}^n \ell_i^\theta e_i \right) .$$

Indeed every linear map can be converted into a semilinear map in such a way. This is part of a general observation collected into the following result.

- Let $R$ be a noncommutative ring, $M$ a left $R$-module, and $\alpha$ an invertible element of $R$. Define the map $\varphi\colon M\to M \colon x \mapsto\alpha x$, so $\varphi(\lambda u)=\alpha \lambda u = (\alpha \lambda \alpha^{-1}) \alpha u = \sigma(\lambda) \varphi(u)$, and $\sigma$ is an inner automorphism of $R$. Thus, the homothety $x\mapsto\alpha x$ need not be a linear map, but is $\sigma$-semilinear.

== General semilinear group ==
Given a vector space V, the set of all invertible semilinear transformations V → V (over all field automorphisms) is the group ΓL(V).

Given a vector space V over K, ΓL(V) decomposes as the semidirect product

$$\operatorname{\Gamma L}(V) = \operatorname{GL}(V) \rtimes \operatorname{Aut}(K) ,$$

where Aut(K) is the automorphisms of K. Similarly, semilinear transforms of other linear groups can be defined as the semidirect product with the automorphism group, or more intrinsically as the group of semilinear maps of a vector space preserving some properties.

We identify Aut(K) with a subgroup of ΓL(V) by fixing a basis B for V and defining the semilinear maps:

$$\sum_{b\in B} \ell_b b \mapsto \sum_{b \in B} \ell_b^\sigma b$$

for any $\sigma \in \operatorname{Aut}(K)$. We shall denoted this subgroup by Aut(K)_{B}. We also see these complements to GL(V) in ΓL(V) are acted on regularly by GL(V) as they correspond to a change of basis.

=== Proof ===
Every linear map is semilinear, thus $\operatorname{GL}(V) \leq \operatorname{\Gamma L}(V)$. Fix a basis B of V. Now given any semilinear map f with respect to a field automorphism σ ∈ Aut(K), then define g : V → V by

$$g \left(\sum_{b \in B} \ell_b b\right)
:= \sum_{b \in B}f \left(\ell_b^{\sigma^{-1}} b\right)
= \sum_{b \in B} \ell_b f (b)$$

As f(B) is also a basis of V, it follows that g is simply a basis exchange of V and so linear and invertible: g ∈ GL(V).

Set $h:=f g^{-1}$. For every $v=\sum_{b \in B} \ell_b b$ in V,

$$hv=fg^{-1}v=\sum_{b \in B} \ell_b^\sigma b$$

thus h is in the Aut(K) subgroup relative to the fixed basis B. This factorization is unique to the fixed basis B. Furthermore, GL(V) is normalized by the action of Aut(K)_{B}, so ΓL(V) = GL(V) ⋊ Aut(K).

== Applications ==
=== Projective geometry ===
The $\operatorname{\Gamma L}(V)$ groups extend the typical classical groups in GL(V). The importance in considering such maps follows from the consideration of projective geometry. The induced action of $\operatorname{\Gamma L}(V)$ on the associated projective space P(V) yields the projective semilinear group, denoted $\operatorname{P\Gamma L}(V)$, extending the projective linear group, PGL(V).

The projective geometry of a vector space V, denoted PG(V), is the lattice of all subspaces of V. Although the typical semilinear map is not a linear map, it does follow that every semilinear map $f\colon V \to W$ induces an order-preserving map $f\colon \operatorname{PG}(V) \to \operatorname{PG}(W)$. That is, every semilinear map induces a projectivity. The converse of this observation (except for the projective line) is the fundamental theorem of projective geometry. Thus semilinear maps are useful because they define the automorphism group of the projective geometry of a vector space.

=== Mathieu group ===
The group PΓL(3,4) can be used to construct the Mathieu group M_{24}, which is one of the sporadic simple groups; PΓL(3,4) is a maximal subgroup of M_{24}, and there are many ways to extend it to the full Mathieu group.

== See also ==
- Complex conjugate vector space
