= Symmetric group =

Type of group in abstract algebra

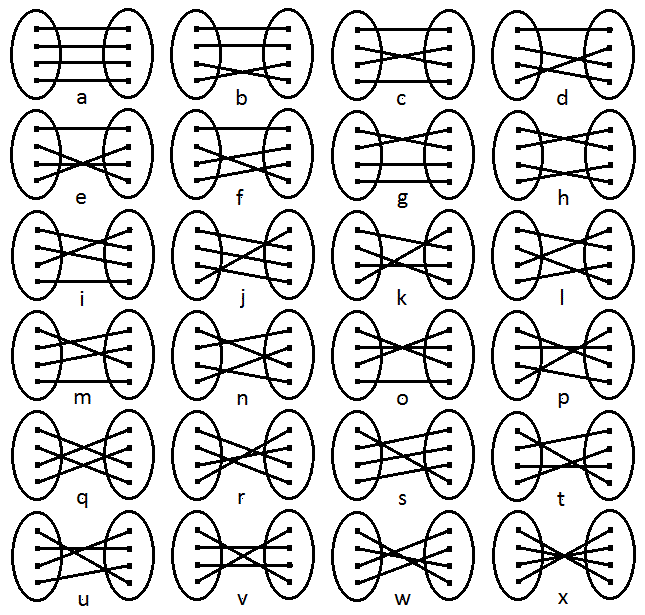
The symmetric group $\mathrm{S}_4$ has 24 elements, viz. the permutations (depicted) of a 4-element set.

A Cayley graph of the symmetric group S_{4} using the generators (red) a right circular shift of all four set elements, and (blue) a left circular shift of the first three set elements.

In abstract algebra, the symmetric group defined over any set is the group whose elements are all the bijections from the set to itself, and whose group operation is the composition of functions. In particular, the finite symmetric group $\mathrm{S}_n$ defined over a finite set of $n$ symbols consists of the permutations that can be performed on the $n$ symbols. Since there are $n!$ ($n$ factorial) such permutation operations, the order (number of elements) of the symmetric group $\mathrm{S}_n$ is $n!$.

Although symmetric groups can be defined on infinite sets, this article focuses on the finite symmetric groups: their applications, their elements, their conjugacy classes, a finite presentation, their subgroups, their automorphism groups, and their representation theory. For the remainder of this article, "symmetric group" will mean a symmetric group on a finite set.

The symmetric group is important to diverse areas of mathematics such as Galois theory, invariant theory, the representation theory of Lie groups, and combinatorics. Cayley's theorem states that every group $G$ is isomorphic to a subgroup of the symmetric group on (the underlying set of) $G$.

== Definition and first properties ==
The symmetric group on a finite set $X$ is the group whose elements are all bijective functions from $X$ to $X$ and whose group operation is that of function composition. For finite sets, "permutations" and "bijective functions" refer to the same operation, namely rearrangement. The symmetric group of degree $n$ is the symmetric group on the set $X = \{1, 2, \ldots, n\}$.

The symmetric group on a set $X$ is denoted in various ways, including $\mathrm{S}_X$, $\mathfrak{S}_X$, $\Sigma_X$, $X!$, and $\operatorname{Sym}(X)$. If $X$ is the set $\{1, 2, \ldots, n\}$ then the name may be abbreviated to $\mathrm{S}_n$, $\mathfrak{S}_n$, $\Sigma_n$, or $\operatorname{Sym}(n)$.

Symmetric groups on infinite sets behave quite differently from symmetric groups on finite sets, and are discussed in (Scott 1987, Ch. 11), (Dixon & Mortimer 1996, Ch. 8), and (Cameron 1999).

The symmetric group on a set of $n$ elements has order $n!$ (the factorial of $n$). It is abelian if and only if $n$ is less than or equal to 2. For $n=0$ and $n=1$ (the empty set and the singleton set), the symmetric groups are trivial (they have order $0! = 1! = 1$). The group S_{n} is solvable if and only if $n \leq 4$. This is an essential part of the proof of the Abel–Ruffini theorem that shows that for every $n > 4$ there are polynomials of degree $n$ which are not solvable by radicals, that is, the solutions cannot be expressed by performing a finite number of operations of addition, subtraction, multiplication, division and root extraction on the polynomial's coefficients.

== Applications ==
The symmetric group on a set of size n is the Galois group of the general polynomial of degree n and plays an important role in Galois theory. In invariant theory, the symmetric group acts on the variables of a multi-variate function, and the functions left invariant are the so-called symmetric functions. In the representation theory of Lie groups, the representation theory of the symmetric group plays a fundamental role through the ideas of Schur functors.

In the theory of Coxeter groups, the symmetric group is the Coxeter group of type A_{n} and occurs as the Weyl group of the general linear group. In combinatorics, the symmetric groups, their elements (permutations), and their representations provide a rich source of problems involving Young tableaux, plactic monoids, and the Bruhat order. Subgroups of symmetric groups are called permutation groups and are widely studied because of their importance in understanding group actions, homogeneous spaces, and automorphism groups of graphs, such as the Higman–Sims group and the Higman–Sims graph.

== Group properties and special elements ==
The elements of the symmetric group on a set X are the permutations of X.

=== Multiplication ===
The group operation in a symmetric group is function composition, denoted by the symbol ∘ or by simple juxtaposition. The composition f ∘ g of permutations f and g, pronounced "f of g", maps any element x of X to f(g(x)). Concretely, let (see permutation for an explanation of notation):
$$f = (1~3)(2)(4~5)=\begin{pmatrix} 1 & 2 & 3 & 4 & 5 \\ 3 & 2 & 1 & 5 & 4\end{pmatrix},$$
$$g = (1~2~5)(3~4)=\begin{pmatrix} 1 & 2 & 3 & 4 & 5 \\ 2 & 5 & 4 & 3 & 1\end{pmatrix}.$$
Applying f after g maps 1 first to 2 and then 2 to itself; 2 to 5 and then to 4; 3 to 4 and then to 5, and so on. So, composing f and g gives
$$fg = f\circ g = (1\ 2\ 4)(3\ 5)=\begin{pmatrix} 1 & 2 &3 & 4 & 5 \\ 2 & 4 & 5 & 1 & 3\end{pmatrix}.$$

A cycle of length L = k · m, taken to the kth power, will decompose into k cycles of length m: For example, (k = 2, m = 3),
$$(1~2~3~4~5~6)^2 = (1~3~5) (2~4~6).$$

=== Verification of group axioms ===
To check that the symmetric group on a set X is indeed a group, it is necessary to verify the group axioms of closure, associativity, identity, and inverses.

1. The operation of function composition is closed in the set of permutations of the given set X.
2. Function composition is always associative.
3. The trivial bijection that assigns each element of X to itself serves as an identity for the group.
4. Every bijection has an inverse function that undoes its action, and thus each element of a symmetric group does have an inverse which is a permutation too.

=== Transpositions, sign, and the alternating group ===
A transposition is a permutation which exchanges two elements and keeps all others fixed; for example (1 3) is a transposition. Every permutation can be written as a product of transpositions; for instance, the permutation g from above can be written as g = (1 2)(2 5)(3 4). Since g can be written as a product of an odd number of transpositions, it is then called an odd permutation, whereas f is an even permutation.

The representation of a permutation as a product of transpositions is not unique; however, the number of transpositions needed to represent a given permutation is either always even or always odd. There are several short proofs of the invariance of this parity of a permutation.

The product of two even permutations is even, the product of two odd permutations is even, and the product of one of each is odd. Thus we can define the sign of a permutation:

$$\operatorname{sgn}f = \begin{cases} +1, & \text{if }f\mbox { is even} \\ -1, & \text{if }f \text{ is odd}. \end{cases}$$

With this definition,

$$\operatorname{sgn}\colon \mathrm{S}_n \rightarrow \{+1, -1\}\$$

is a group homomorphism ({+1, −1} is a group under multiplication, where +1 is e, the neutral element). The kernel of this homomorphism, that is, the set of all even permutations, is called the alternating group A_{n}. It is a normal subgroup of S_{n}, and for n ≥ 2 it has n!/2 elements. The group S_{n} is the semidirect product of A_{n} and any subgroup generated by a single transposition.

Furthermore, every permutation can be written as a product of adjacent transpositions, that is, transpositions of the form (a a+1). For instance, the permutation g from above can also be written as g = (4 5)(3 4)(4 5)(1 2)(2 3)(3 4)(4 5). The sorting algorithm bubble sort is an application of this fact. The representation of a permutation as a product of adjacent transpositions is also not unique.

=== Cycles ===
A cycle of length k is a permutation f for which there exists an element x in {1, ..., n} such that x, f(x), f^{2}(x), ..., f^{k}(x) = x are the only elements moved by f; it conventionally is required that k ≥ 2 since with k = 1 the element x itself would not be moved either. The permutation h defined by

$$h = \begin{pmatrix} 1 & 2 & 3 & 4 & 5 \\ 4 & 2 & 1 & 3 & 5\end{pmatrix}$$

is a cycle of length three, since h(1) = 4, h(4) = 3 and h(3) = 1, leaving 2 and 5 untouched. We denote such a cycle by (1 4 3), but it could equally well be written (4 3 1) or (3 1 4) by starting at a different point. The order of a cycle is equal to its length. Cycles of length two are transpositions. Two cycles are disjoint if they have disjoint subsets of elements. Disjoint cycles commute: for example, in S_{6} there is the equality (4 1 3)(2 5 6) = (2 5 6)(4 1 3). Every element of S_{n} can be written as a product of disjoint cycles; this representation is unique up to the order of the factors, and the freedom present in representing each individual cycle by choosing its starting point.

Cycles admit the following conjugation property with any permutation $\sigma$, this property is often used to obtain its generators and relations.

$$\sigma\begin{pmatrix} a & b & c & \ldots \end{pmatrix}\sigma^{-1}=\begin{pmatrix}\sigma(a) & \sigma(b) & \sigma(c) & \ldots\end{pmatrix}$$

=== Special elements ===
Certain elements of the symmetric group of {1, 2, ..., n} are of particular interest (these can be generalized to the symmetric group of any finite totally ordered set, but not to that of an unordered set).

The order reversing permutation is the one given by:

$$\begin{pmatrix} 1 & 2 & \cdots & n\\
n & n-1 & \cdots & 1\end{pmatrix}.$$

This is the unique maximal element with respect to the Bruhat order and the longest element in the symmetric group with respect to generating set consisting of the adjacent transpositions (i i+1), 1 ≤ i ≤ n − 1.

This is an involution, and consists of $\lfloor n/2 \rfloor$ (non-adjacent) transpositions

$(1\,n)(2\,n-1)\cdots,\text{ or }\sum_{k=1}^{n-1} k = \frac{n(n-1)}{2}\text{ adjacent transpositions: }$

$$(n\,n-1)(n-1\,n-2)\cdots(2\,1)(n-1\,n-2)(n-2\,n-3)\cdots,$$

so it thus has sign:

$$\mathrm{sgn}(\rho_n) = (-1)^{\lfloor n/2 \rfloor} =(-1)^{n(n-1)/2} = \begin{cases}
+1 & n \equiv 0,1 \pmod{4}\\
-1 & n \equiv 2,3 \pmod{4}
\end{cases}$$

which is 4-periodic in n.

In S_{2n}, the perfect shuffle is the permutation that splits the set into 2 piles and interleaves them. Its sign is also $(-1)^{\lfloor n/2 \rfloor}.$

Note that the reverse on n elements and perfect shuffle on 2n elements have the same sign; these are important to the classification of Clifford algebras, which are 8-periodic.

== Conjugacy classes ==
The conjugacy classes of S_{n} correspond to the cycle types of permutations; that is, two elements of S_{n} are conjugate in S_{n} if and only if they consist of the same number of disjoint cycles of the same lengths. For instance, in S_{5}, (1 2 3)(4 5) and (1 4 3)(2 5) are conjugate; (1 2 3)(4 5) and (1 2)(4 5) are not. A conjugating element of S_{n} can be constructed in "two line notation" by placing the "cycle notations" of the two conjugate permutations on top of one another. Continuing the previous example,
$$k = \begin{pmatrix} 1 & 2 & 3 & 4 & 5 \\ 1 & 4 & 3 & 2 & 5\end{pmatrix},$$
which can be written as the product of cycles as (2 4). This permutation then relates (1 2 3)(4 5) and (1 4 3)(2 5) via conjugation, that is,
$$(2~4)\circ(1~2~3)(4~5)\circ(2~4)=(1~4~3)(2~5).$$
It is clear that such a permutation is not unique.

Conjugacy classes of S_{n} correspond to integer partitions of n: to the partition μ = (μ_{1}, μ_{2}, ..., μ_{k}) with $n=\sum_{i=1}^k \mu_i$ and μ_{1} ≥ μ_{2} ≥ ... ≥ μ_{k}, is associated the set C_{μ} of permutations with cycles of lengths μ_{1}, μ_{2}, ..., μ_{k}. Then C_{μ} is a conjugacy class of S_{n}, whose elements are said to be of cycle-type $\mu$.

== Low degree groups ==
The low-degree symmetric groups have simpler and exceptional structure, and often must be treated separately.

S_{0} and S_{1}
The symmetric groups on the empty set and the singleton set are trivial, which corresponds to 0! = 1! = 1. In this case the alternating group agrees with the symmetric group, rather than being an index 2 subgroup, and the sign map is trivial. In the case of S_{0}, its only member is the empty function.

S_{2}
This group consists of exactly two elements: the identity and the permutation swapping the two points. It is a cyclic group and is thus abelian. In Galois theory, this corresponds to the fact that the quadratic formula gives a direct solution to the general quadratic polynomial after extracting only a single root. In invariant theory, the representation theory of the symmetric group on two points is quite simple and is seen as writing a function of two variables as a sum of its symmetric and anti-symmetric parts: Setting f_{s}(x, y) = f(x, y) + f(y, x), and f_{a}(x, y) = f(x, y) − f(y, x), one gets that 2⋅f = f_{s} + f_{a}. This process is known as symmetrization.

S_{3}
S_{3} is the first nonabelian symmetric group. This group is isomorphic to the dihedral group of order 6, the group of reflection and rotation symmetries of an equilateral triangle, since these symmetries permute the three vertices of the triangle. Cycles of length two correspond to reflections, and cycles of length three are rotations. In Galois theory, the sign map from S_{3} to S_{2} corresponds to the resolving quadratic for a cubic polynomial, as discovered by Gerolamo Cardano, while the A_{3} kernel corresponds to the use of the discrete Fourier transform of order 3 in the solution, in the form of Lagrange resolvents.

S_{4}
The group S_{4} is isomorphic to the group of proper rotations about opposite faces, opposite diagonals and opposite edges, 9, 8 and 6 permutations, of the cube. This group also describes the symmetries under rotations and reflections of a regular tetrahedron, since these symmetries permute the four vertices of the tetrahedron. In this context, the subgroup A_{4} represents the rotations of the tetrahedron. These two symmetries of three-dimensional objects yield two three-dimensional irreducible representations of S_{4}. S_{4} has a Klein four-group V as a proper normal subgroup, namely the even transpositions {(1), (1 2)(3 4), (1 3)(2 4), (1 4)(2 3)}, with quotient S_{3}. In Galois theory, this map corresponds to the resolving cubic to a quartic polynomial, which allows the quartic to be solved by radicals, as established by Lodovico Ferrari. The Klein group can be understood in terms of the Lagrange resolvents of the quartic. The map from S_{4} to S_{3} also yields a 2-dimensional irreducible representation, which is an irreducible representation of a symmetric group of degree n of dimension below n − 1, which only occurs for n = 4.

S_{5}
S_{5} is the first non-solvable symmetric group. Along with the special linear group SL(2, 5) and the icosahedral group A_{5} × S_{2}, S_{5} is one of the three non-solvable groups of order 120, up to isomorphism. S_{5} is the Galois group of the general quintic equation, and the fact that S_{5} is not a solvable group translates into the non-existence of a general formula to solve quintic polynomials by radicals. There is an exotic inclusion map S_{5} → S_{6} as a transitive subgroup; the obvious inclusion map S_{n} → S_{n+1} fixes a point and thus is not transitive. This yields the outer automorphism of S_{6}, discussed below, and corresponds to the resolvent sextic of a quintic.

S_{6}
Unlike all other symmetric groups, S_{6}, has an outer automorphism. Using the language of Galois theory, this can also be understood in terms of Lagrange resolvents. The resolvent of a quintic is of degree 6—this corresponds to an exotic inclusion map S_{5} → S_{6} as a transitive subgroup (the obvious inclusion map S_{n} → S_{n+1} fixes a point and thus is not transitive) and, while this map does not make the general quintic solvable, it yields the exotic outer automorphism of S_{6}—see Automorphisms of the symmetric and alternating groups for details.

Note that while A_{6} and A_{7} have an exceptional Schur multiplier (a triple cover) and that these extend to triple covers of S_{6} and S_{7}, these do not correspond to exceptional Schur multipliers of the symmetric group.

=== Maps between symmetric groups ===
Other than the trivial map S_{n} → C_{1} ≅ S_{0} ≅ S_{1} and the sign map S_{n} → S_{2}, the most notable homomorphisms between symmetric groups, in order of relative dimension, are:

- S_{4} → S_{3} corresponding to the exceptional normal subgroup V < A_{4} < S_{4};
- S_{6} → S_{6} (or rather, a class of such maps up to inner automorphism) corresponding to the outer automorphism of S_{6}.
- S_{5} → S_{6} as a transitive subgroup, yielding the outer automorphism of S_{6} as discussed above.

There are also a host of other homomorphisms S_{m} → S_{n} where m < n.

== Relation with alternating group ==
For n ≥ 5, the alternating group A_{n} is simple, and the induced quotient is the sign map: A_{n} → S_{n} → S_{2} which is split by taking a transposition of two elements. Thus S_{n} is the semidirect product A_{n} ⋊ S_{2}, and has no other proper normal subgroups, as they would intersect A_{n} in either the identity (and thus themselves be the identity or a 2-element group, which is not normal), or in A_{n} (and thus themselves be A_{n} or S_{n}).

S_{n} acts on its subgroup A_{n} by conjugation, and for n ≠ 6, S_{n} is the full automorphism group of A_{n}: Aut(A_{n}) ≅ S_{n}. Conjugation by even elements are inner automorphisms of A_{n} while the outer automorphism of A_{n} of order 2 corresponds to conjugation by an odd element. For n = 6, there is an exceptional outer automorphism of A_{n} so S_{n} is not the full automorphism group of A_{n}.

Conversely, for n ≠ 6, S_{n} has no outer automorphisms, and for n ≠ 2 it has no center, so for n ≠ 2, 6 it is a complete group, as discussed in automorphism group, below.

For n ≥ 5, S_{n} is an almost simple group, as it lies between the simple group A_{n} and its group of automorphisms.

S_{n} can be embedded into A_{n+2} by appending the transposition (n + 1, n + 2) to all odd permutations, while embedding into A_{n+1} is impossible for n > 1.

== Generators and relations ==
The symmetric group on n letters is generated by the adjacent transpositions $\sigma_i = (i, i + 1)$ that swap i and i + 1. The collection $\sigma_1, \ldots, \sigma_{n-1}$ generates S_{n} subject to the following relations:

- $\sigma_i^2 = 1,$
- $\sigma_i\sigma_j = \sigma_j\sigma_i$ for $|i-j| > 1$, and
- $(\sigma_i\sigma_{i+1})^3 =1,$

where 1 represents the identity permutation. This representation endows the symmetric group with the structure of a Coxeter group (and so also a reflection group).

Other possible generating sets include the set of transpositions that swap 1 and i for 2 ≤ i ≤ n, or more generally any set of transpositions that forms a connected graph, and a set containing any n-cycle and a 2-cycle of adjacent elements in the n-cycle.

== Subgroup structure ==
A subgroup of a symmetric group is called a permutation group.

=== Normal subgroups ===
The normal subgroups of the finite symmetric groups are well understood. If n ≤ 2, S_{n} has at most 2 elements, and so has no nontrivial proper subgroups. The alternating group of degree n is always a normal subgroup, a proper one for n ≥ 2 and nontrivial for n ≥ 3; for n ≥ 3 it is in fact the only nontrivial proper normal subgroup of S_{n}, except when n = 4 where there is one additional such normal subgroup, which is isomorphic to the Klein four group.

The symmetric group on an infinite set does not have a subgroup of index 2, as Vitali (1915) proved that each permutation can be written as a product of three squares. (Any squared element must belong to the hypothesized subgroup of index 2, hence so must the product of any number of squares.) However it contains the normal subgroup S of permutations that fix all but finitely many elements, which is generated by transpositions. Those elements of S that are products of an even number of transpositions form a subgroup of index 2 in S, called the alternating subgroup A. Since A is even a characteristic subgroup of S, it is also a normal subgroup of the full symmetric group of the infinite set. The groups A and S are the only nontrivial proper normal subgroups of the symmetric group on a countably infinite set. This was first proved by Onofri (1929) and independently Schreier–Ulam (1934). For more details see (Scott 1987, Ch. 11.3). That result, often called the Schreier-Ulam theorem, is superseded by a stronger one which says that the nontrivial normal subgroups of the symmetric group on a set $X$ are 1) the even permutations with finite support and 2) for every cardinality $\aleph_0 \leq \kappa \leq |X|$ the group of permutations with support less than $\kappa$ (Dixon & Mortimer 1996, Ch. 8.1).

=== Maximal subgroups ===
The maximal subgroups of S_{n} fall into three classes: the intransitive, the imprimitive, and the primitive. The intransitive maximal subgroups are exactly those of the form S_{k} × S_{n–k} for 1 ≤ k < n/2. The imprimitive maximal subgroups are exactly those of the form S_{k} wr S_{n/k}, where 2 ≤ k ≤ n/2 is a proper divisor of n and "wr" denotes the wreath product. The primitive maximal subgroups are more difficult to identify, but with the assistance of the O'Nan–Scott theorem and the classification of finite simple groups, (Liebeck, Praeger & Saxl 1988) gave a fairly satisfactory description of the maximal subgroups of this type, according to (Dixon & Mortimer 1996, p. 268).

=== Sylow subgroups ===
The Sylow subgroups of the symmetric groups are important examples of p-groups. They are more easily described in special cases first:

The Sylow p-subgroups of the symmetric group of degree p are just the cyclic subgroups generated by p-cycles. There are (p − 1)!/(p − 1) = (p − 2)! such subgroups simply by counting generators. The normalizer therefore has order p⋅(p − 1) and is known as a Frobenius group F_{p(p−1)} (especially for p = 5), and is the affine general linear group, AGL(1, p).

The Sylow p-subgroups of the symmetric group of degree p^{2} are the wreath product of two cyclic groups of order p. For instance, when p = 3, a Sylow 3-subgroup of Sym(9) is generated by a = (1 4 7)(2 5 8)(3 6 9) and the elements x = (1 2 3), y = (4 5 6), z = (7 8 9), and every element of the Sylow 3-subgroup has the form a^{i}x^{j}y^{k}z^{l} for $0 \le i,j,k,l \le 2$.

The Sylow p-subgroups of the symmetric group of degree p^{n} are sometimes denoted W_{p}(n), and using this notation one has that W_{p}(n + 1) is the wreath product of W_{p}(n) and W_{p}(1).

In general, the Sylow p-subgroups of the symmetric group of degree n are a direct product of a_{i} copies of W_{p}(i), where 0 ≤ a_{i} ≤ p − 1 and n = a_{0} + p⋅a_{1} + ... + p^{k}⋅a_{k} (the base p expansion of n).

For instance, W_{2}(1) = C_{2} and W_{2}(2) = D_{8}, the dihedral group of order 8, and so a Sylow 2-subgroup of the symmetric group of degree 7 is generated by { (1,3)(2,4), (1,2), (3,4), (5,6) } and is isomorphic to D_{8} × C_{2}.

These calculations are attributed to (Kaloujnine 1948) and described in more detail in (Rotman 1995, p. 176). Note however that (Kerber 1971, p. 26) attributes the result to an 1844 work of Cauchy, and mentions that it is even covered in textbook form in (Netto 1882, §39–40).

=== Transitive subgroups ===
A transitive subgroup of S_{n} is a subgroup whose action on {1, 2, ,..., n} is transitive. For example, the Galois group of a (finite) Galois extension is a transitive subgroup of S_{n}, for some n.

=== Young subgroups ===
A subgroup of S_{n} that is generated by transpositions is called a Young subgroup. They are all of the form $S_{a_1} \times \cdots \times S_{a_\ell}$ where $(a_1, \ldots, a_\ell)$ is an integer partition of n. These groups may also be characterized as the parabolic subgroups of S_{n} when it is viewed as a reflection group.

=== Cayley's theorem ===
Cayley's theorem states that every group G is isomorphic to a subgroup of some symmetric group. In particular, one may take a subgroup of the symmetric group on the elements of G, since every group acts on itself faithfully by (left or right) multiplication.

== Cyclic subgroups ==
Cyclic groups are those that are generated by a single permutation. When a permutation is represented in cycle notation, the order of the cyclic subgroup that it generates is the least common multiple of the lengths of its cycles. For example, in S_{5}, one cyclic subgroup of order 5 is generated by (13254), whereas the largest cyclic subgroups of S_{5} are generated by elements like (123)(45) that have one cycle of length 3 and another cycle of length 2. This rules out many groups as possible subgroups of symmetric groups of a given size. For example, S_{5} has no subgroup of order 15 (a divisor of the order of S_{5}), because the only group of order 15 is the cyclic group. The largest possible order of a cyclic subgroup (equivalently, the largest possible order of an element in S_{n}) is given by Landau's function.

== Automorphism group ==
n	Aut(S_{n})	Out(S_{n})	Z(S_{n})
n ≠ 2, 6	S_{n}	C_{1}	C_{1}
n = 2	C_{1}	C_{1}	S_{2}
n = 6	S_{6} ⋊ C_{2}	C_{2}	C_{1}

For n ≠ 2, 6, S_{n} is a complete group: its center and outer automorphism group are both trivial.

For n = 2, the automorphism group is trivial, but S_{2} is not trivial: it is isomorphic to C_{2}, which is abelian, and hence the center is the whole group.

For n = 6, it has an outer automorphism of order 2: Out(S_{6}) = C_{2}, and the automorphism group is a semidirect product Aut(S_{6}) = S_{6} ⋊ C_{2}.

In fact, for any set X of cardinality other than 6, every automorphism of the symmetric group on X is inner, a result first due to (Schreier & Ulam 1936) according to (Dixon & Mortimer 1996, p. 259).

== Homology ==
The group homology of S_{n} is quite regular and stabilizes: the first homology (concretely, the abelianization) is:

$$H_1(\mathrm{S}_n,\mathbf{Z}) = \begin{cases} 0 & n < 2\\
\mathbf{Z}/2 & n \geq 2.\end{cases}$$

The first homology group is the abelianization, and corresponds to the sign map S_{n} → S_{2} which is the abelianization for n ≥ 2; for n < 2 the symmetric group is trivial. This homology is easily computed as follows: S_{n} is generated by involutions (2-cycles, which have order 2), so the only non-trivial maps S_{n} → C_{p} are to S_{2} and all involutions are conjugate, hence map to the same element in the abelianization (since conjugation is trivial in abelian groups). Thus the only possible maps S_{n} → S_{2} ≅ {±1} send an involution to 1 (the trivial map) or to −1 (the sign map). One must also show that the sign map is well-defined, but assuming that, this gives the first homology of S_{n}.

The second homology (concretely, the Schur multiplier) is:

$$H_2(\mathrm{S}_n,\mathbf{Z}) = \begin{cases} 0 & n < 4\\
\mathbf{Z}/2 & n \geq 4.\end{cases}$$

This was computed in (Schur 1911), and corresponds to the double cover of the symmetric group, 2 · S_{n}.

Note that the exceptional low-dimensional homology of the alternating group ($H_1(\mathrm{A}_3)\cong H_1(\mathrm{A}_4) \cong \mathrm{C}_3,$ corresponding to non-trivial abelianization, and $H_2(\mathrm{A}_6)\cong H_2(\mathrm{A}_7) \cong \mathrm{C}_6,$ due to the exceptional 3-fold cover) does not change the homology of the symmetric group; the alternating group phenomena do yield symmetric group phenomena – the map $\mathrm{A}_4 \twoheadrightarrow \mathrm{C}_3$ extends to $\mathrm{S}_4 \twoheadrightarrow \mathrm{S}_3,$ and the triple covers of A_{6} and A_{7} extend to triple covers of S_{6} and S_{7} – but these are not homological – the map $\mathrm{S}_4 \twoheadrightarrow \mathrm{S}_3$ does not change the abelianization of S_{4}, and the triple covers do not correspond to homology either.

The homology "stabilizes" in the sense of stable homotopy theory: there is an inclusion map S_{n} → S_{n+1}, and for fixed k, the induced map on homology H_{k}(S_{n}) → H_{k}(S_{n+1}) is an isomorphism for sufficiently high n. This is analogous to the homology of families Lie groups stabilizing.

The homology of the infinite symmetric group is computed in (Nakaoka 1961), with the cohomology algebra forming a Hopf algebra.

== Representation theory ==
The representation theory of the symmetric group is a particular case of the representation theory of finite groups, for which a concrete and detailed theory can be obtained. This has a large area of potential applications, from symmetric function theory to problems of quantum mechanics for a number of identical particles.

The symmetric group S_{n} has order n!. Its conjugacy classes are labeled by partitions of n. Therefore, according to the representation theory of a finite group, the number of inequivalent irreducible representations, over the complex numbers, is equal to the number of partitions of n. Unlike the general situation for finite groups, there is in fact a natural way to parametrize irreducible representation by the same set that parametrizes conjugacy classes, namely by partitions of n or equivalently Young diagrams of size n.

Each such irreducible representation can be realized over the integers (every permutation acting by a matrix with integer coefficients); it can be explicitly constructed by computing the Young symmetrizers acting on a space generated by the Young tableaux of shape given by the Young diagram.

Over other fields the situation can become much more complicated. If the field K has characteristic equal to zero or greater than n then by Maschke's theorem the group algebra KS_{n} is semisimple. In these cases the irreducible representations defined over the integers give the complete set of irreducible representations (after reduction modulo the characteristic if necessary).

However, the irreducible representations of the symmetric group are not known in arbitrary characteristic. In this context it is more usual to use the language of modules rather than representations. The representation obtained from an irreducible representation defined over the integers by reducing modulo the characteristic will not in general be irreducible. The modules so constructed are called Specht modules, and every irreducible does arise inside some such module. There are now fewer irreducibles, and although they can be classified they are very poorly understood. For example, even their dimensions are not known in general.

The determination of the irreducible modules for the symmetric group over an arbitrary field is widely regarded as one of the most important open problems in representation theory.

== See also ==
- Braid group
- History of group theory
- Signed symmetric group and Generalized symmetric group
- Symmetry in quantum mechanics § Exchange symmetry
- Symmetric inverse semigroup
- Symmetric power
