= Alternating group =

Group of even permutations of a finite set

In mathematics, an alternating group is the group of even permutations of a finite set. The alternating group on a set of n elements is called the alternating group of degree n, or the alternating group on n letters and denoted by A_{n} or Alt(n).

== Basic properties ==
For n > 1, the group A_{n} is the commutator subgroup of the symmetric group S_{n} with index 2 and has therefore n!/2 elements. It is the kernel of the signature group homomorphism sgn : S_{n} → {1, −1} explained under symmetric group.

The group A_{n} is abelian if and only if n ≤ 3 and simple if and only if n = 3 or n ≥ 5. A_{5} is the smallest non-abelian simple group, having order 60, and thus the smallest non-solvable group.

The group A_{4} has the Klein four-group V as a proper normal subgroup, namely the identity and the double transpositions { (), (12)(34), (13)(24), (14)(23) }, that is the kernel of the surjection of A_{4} onto A_{3} ≅ Z_{3}. We have the exact sequence V → A_{4} → A_{3} = Z_{3}. In Galois theory, this map, or rather the corresponding map S_{4} → S_{3}, corresponds to associating the Lagrange resolvent cubic to a quartic, which allows the quartic polynomial to be solved by radicals, as established by Lodovico Ferrari.

== Conjugacy classes ==
As in the symmetric group, any two elements of A_{n} that are conjugate by an element of A_{n} must have the same cycle shape. The converse is not necessarily true, however. If the cycle shape consists only of cycles of odd length with no two cycles the same length, where cycles of length one are included in the cycle type, then there are exactly two conjugacy classes for this cycle shape (Scott 1987, §11.1, p299).

Examples:

- The two permutations (123) and (132) are not conjugates in A_{3}, although they have the same cycle shape, and are therefore conjugate in S_{3}.
- The permutation (123)(45678) is not conjugate to its inverse (132)(48765) in A_{8}, although the two permutations have the same cycle shape, so they are conjugate in S_{8}.

== Relation with symmetric group ==
See Symmetric group.

As finite symmetric groups are the groups of all permutations of a set with finite elements, and the alternating groups are groups of even permutations, alternating groups are subgroups of finite symmetric groups. For n>4, along with the group itself, and the trivial subgroup, the alternating group is the only other normal subgroup a symmetric group has.

== Generators and relations ==
For n ≥ 3, A_{n} is generated by 3-cycles, since 3-cycles can be obtained by combining pairs of transpositions. This generating set is often used to prove that A_{n} is simple for n ≥ 5.

== Automorphism group ==
n	Aut(A_{n})	Out(A_{n})
n ≥ 4, n ≠ 6	S_{n}	Z_{2}
n = 1, 2	Z_{1}	Z_{1}
n = 3	Z_{2}	Z_{2}
n = 6	S_{6} ⋊ Z_{2}	V = Z_{2} × Z_{2}

For n > 3, except for n = 6, the automorphism group of A_{n} is the symmetric group S_{n}, with inner automorphism group A_{n} and outer automorphism group Z_{2}; the outer automorphism comes from conjugation by an odd permutation.

For n = 1 and 2, the automorphism group is trivial. For n = 3 the automorphism group is Z_{2}, with trivial inner automorphism group and outer automorphism group Z_{2}.

The outer automorphism group of A_{6} is the Klein four-group V = Z_{2} × Z_{2}, and is related to the outer automorphism of S_{6}. The extra outer automorphism in A_{6} swaps the 3-cycles (like (123)) with elements of shape 3^{2} (like (123)(456)).

== Exceptional isomorphisms ==
There are some exceptional isomorphisms between some of the small alternating groups and small groups of Lie type, particularly projective special linear groups. These are:

- A_{4} is isomorphic to PSL_{2}(3) and the symmetry group of chiral tetrahedral symmetry.
- A_{5} is isomorphic to PSL_{2}(4), PSL_{2}(5), and the symmetry group of chiral icosahedral symmetry. (See for an indirect isomorphism of PSL_{2}(F_{5}) → A_{5} using a classification of simple groups of order 60, and here for a direct proof).
- A_{6} is isomorphic to PSL_{2}(9) and PSp_{4}(2)'.
- A_{8} is isomorphic to PSL_{4}(2).

More obviously, A_{3} is isomorphic to the cyclic group Z_{3}, and A_{0}, A_{1}, and A_{2} are isomorphic to the trivial group (which is also SL_{1}(q) = PSL_{1}(q) for any q).

== Examples ==
=== S_{4} and A_{4} ===
Cayley table of the symmetric group S_{4} The odd permutations are colored: Transpositions in green and 4-cycles in orange

Cayley table of the alternating group A_{4} Elements: The even permutations (the identity, eight 3-cycles and three double-transpositions (double transpositions in boldface)) Subgroups:

Cycle graphs
A_{3} = Z_{3} (order 3)	A_{4} (order 12)	A_{4} × Z_{2} (order 24)
S_{3} = Dih_{3} (order 6)	S_{4} (order 24)	A_{4} in S_{4} on the left

=== A_{5} as a subgroup of 3-space rotations ===
A_{5} < SO_{3}(R) ball – radius π – principal homogeneous space of SO(3) icosidodecahedron – radius π – conjugacy class of 2-2-cycles icosahedron – radius 4π/5 – half of the split conjugacy class of 5-cycles dodecahedron – radius 2π/3 – conjugacy class of 3-cycles icosahedron – radius 2π/5 – second half of split 5-cycles

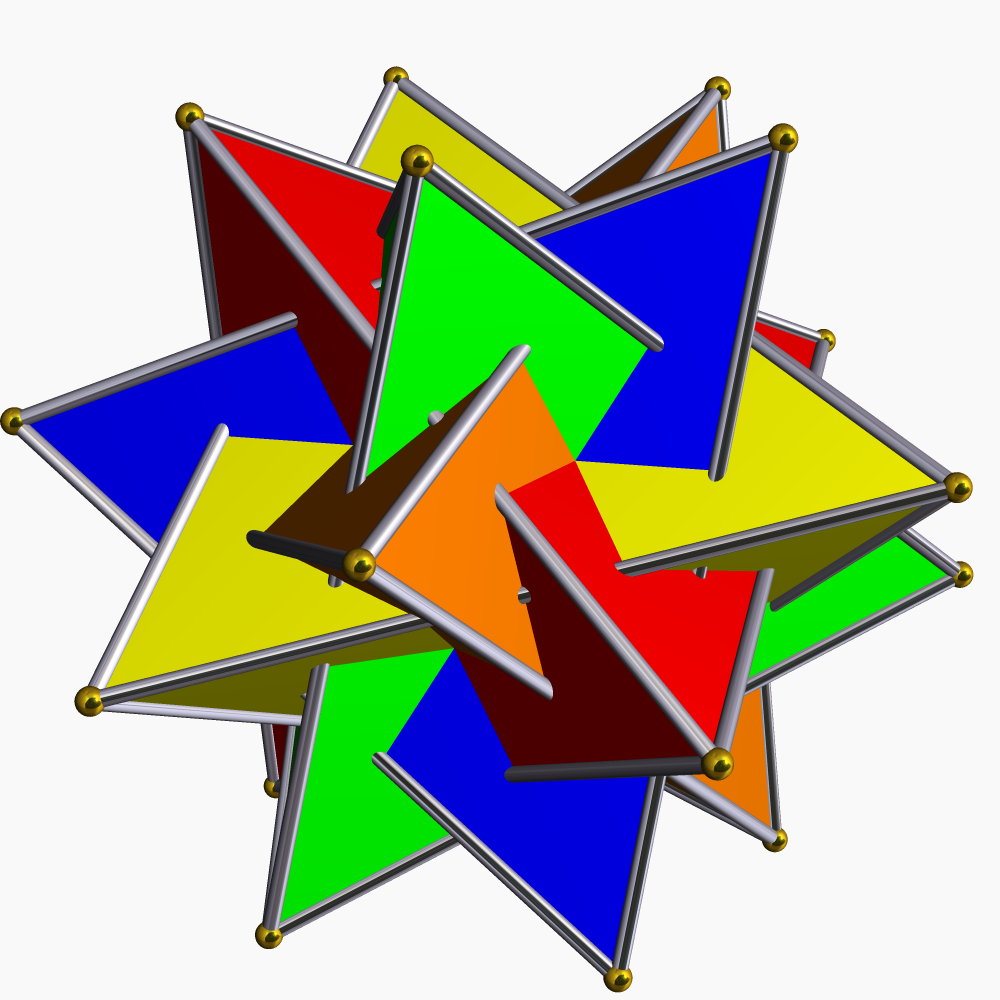
Compound of five tetrahedra. A_{5} acts on the dodecahedron by permuting the 5 inscribed tetrahedra. Even permutations of these tetrahedra are exactly the symmetric rotations of the dodecahedron and characterizes the A_{5} < SO_{3}(R) correspondence.

A_{5} is the group of isometries of a dodecahedron in 3-space, so there is a representation A_{5} → SO_{3}(R).

In this picture the vertices of the polyhedra represent the elements of the group, with the center of the sphere representing the identity element. Each vertex represents a rotation about the axis pointing from the center to that vertex, by an angle equal to the distance from the origin, in radians. Vertices in the same polyhedron are in the same conjugacy class. Since the conjugacy class equation for A_{5} is 1 + 12 + 12 + 15 + 20 = 60, we obtain four distinct (nontrivial) polyhedra.

The vertices of each polyhedron are in bijective correspondence with the elements of its conjugacy class, with the exception of the conjugacy class of (2,2)-cycles, which is represented by an icosidodecahedron on the outer surface, with its antipodal vertices identified with each other. The reason for this redundancy is that the corresponding rotations are by π radians, and so can be represented by a vector of length π in either of two directions. Thus the class of (2,2)-cycles contains 15 elements, while the icosidodecahedron has 30 vertices.

The two conjugacy classes of twelve 5-cycles in A_{5} are represented by two icosahedra, of radii 2π/5 and 4π/5, respectively. The nontrivial outer automorphism in Out(A_{5}) ≃ Z_{2} interchanges these two classes and the corresponding icosahedra.

=== The 15 puzzle ===
A 15 puzzle.

It can be proved that the 15 puzzle, a famous example of the sliding puzzle, can be represented by the alternating group A_{15}, because the combinations of the 15 puzzle can be generated by 3-cycles. In fact, any 2k − 1 sliding puzzle with square tiles of equal size can be represented by A_{2k−1}.

== Subgroups ==
A_{4} is the smallest group demonstrating that the converse of Lagrange's theorem is not true in general: given a finite group G and a divisor d of |G|, there does not necessarily exist a subgroup of G with order d: the group G = A_{4}, of order 12, has no subgroup of order 6. A subgroup of three elements (generated by a cyclic rotation of three objects) with any distinct nontrivial element generates the whole group.

For all n > 4, A_{n} has no nontrivial (that is, proper) normal subgroups. Thus, A_{n} is a simple group for all n > 4. A_{5} is the smallest non-solvable group.

== Group homology ==
The group homology of the alternating groups exhibits stabilization, as in stable homotopy theory: for sufficiently large n, it is constant. However, there are some low-dimensional exceptional homology. Note that the homology of the symmetric group exhibits similar stabilization, but without the low-dimensional exceptions (additional homology elements).

=== H_{1}: Abelianization ===
The first homology group coincides with abelianization, and (since A_{n} is perfect, except for the cited exceptions) is thus:

H_{1}(A_{n}, Z) = Z_{1} for n = 0, 1, 2;
H_{1}(A_{3}, Z) = A^{ab}_{3} = A_{3} = Z_{3};
H_{1}(A_{4}, Z) = A^{ab}_{4} = Z_{3};
H_{1}(A_{n}, Z) = Z_{1} for n ≥ 5.

This is easily seen directly, as follows. A_{n} is generated by 3-cycles – so the only non-trivial abelianization maps are A_{n} → Z_{3}, since order-3 elements must map to order-3 elements – and for n ≥ 5 all 3-cycles are conjugate, so they must map to the same element in the abelianization, since conjugation is trivial in abelian groups. Thus a 3-cycle like (123) must map to the same element as its inverse (321), but thus must map to the identity, as it must then have order dividing 2 and 3, so the abelianization is trivial.

For n < 3, A_{n} is trivial, and thus has trivial abelianization. For A_{3} and A_{4} one can compute the abelianization directly, noting that the 3-cycles form two conjugacy classes (rather than all being conjugate) and there are non-trivial maps A_{3} ↠ Z_{3} (in fact an isomorphism) and A_{4} ↠ Z_{3}.

=== H_{2}: Schur multipliers ===
The Schur multipliers of the alternating groups A_{n} (in the case where n is at least 5) are the cyclic groups of order 2, except in the case where n is either 6 or 7, in which case there is also a triple cover. In these cases, then, the Schur multiplier is (the cyclic group) of order 6. These were first computed in (Schur 1911).

H_{2}(A_{n}, Z) = Z_{1} for n = 1, 2, 3;
H_{2}(A_{n}, Z) = Z_{2} for n = 4, 5;
H_{2}(A_{n}, Z) = Z_{6} for n = 6, 7;
H_{2}(A_{n}, Z) = Z_{2} for n ≥ 8.
