= Projective unitary group =

Quotient of special unitary group by its center

In mathematics, the projective unitary group PU(n) is the quotient of the unitary group U(n) by the right multiplication of its center, U(1), embedded as scalars. Abstractly, it is the holomorphic isometry group of complex projective space, just as the projective orthogonal group is the isometry group of real projective space.

In terms of matrices, elements of U(n) are complex n×n unitary matrices, and elements of the center are diagonal matrices equal to e^{iθ}I, where I is the identity matrix. Thus, elements of PU(n) correspond to equivalence classes of unitary matrices under multiplication by a constant phase θ. This space is not SU(n) (which only requires the determinant to be one), because SU(n) still contains elements e^{iθ}I where e^{iθ} is an n-th root of unity (since then det(e^{iθ}I) = e^{iθn} = 1).

Abstractly, given a Hermitian space V, the group PU(V) is the image of the unitary group U(V) in the automorphism group of the projective space P(V).

== Projective special unitary group ==

The projective special unitary group $\operatorname{PSU}(n)$ is equal to the projective unitary group, in contrast to the orthogonal case.

The connections between the $\operatorname{U}(n)$, $\operatorname{SU}(n)$, their centers, and the projective unitary groups is shown in the commutative diagram (with exact rows and columns) on the right.

The center $\mathrm{Z}(\mathrm{SU}(n))$ of the special unitary group $\mathrm{SU}(n)$ is the scalar matrices of the $n$-th roots of unity:

$$\mathrm{Z}(\mathrm{SU}(n)) = \mathrm{SU}(n) \cap \mathrm{Z}(\mathrm{U}(n)) \cong \mathbb{Z}/n$$

The natural map

$$\mathrm{PSU}(n) = \mathrm{SU}(n)/\mathrm{Z}(\mathrm{SU}(n)) \to \mathrm{PU}(n) = \mathrm{U}(n)/\mathrm{Z}(\mathrm{U}(n))$$

is an isomorphism, by the second isomorphism theorem, thus

$$\mathrm{PU}(n) = \mathrm{PSU}(n) = \mathrm{SU}(n)/(\mathbb{Z}/n).$$

and the special unitary group $\operatorname{SU}(n)$ is an $n$-fold cover of the projective unitary group.

== Examples ==
At n = 1, U(1) is abelian and so is equal to its center. Therefore PU(1) = U(1)/U(1) is a trivial group.

At n = 2, $\mathrm{SU}(2) \cong \mathrm{Spin}(3) \cong \mathrm{Sp}(1)$ (see spin group and symplectic group), all being representable by unit norm quaternions (versors), and $\mathrm{PU}(2) \cong \mathrm{SO}(3)$ via:

$$\mathrm{PU}(2) = \mathrm{PSU}(2) = \mathrm{SU}(2)/(\mathbb{Z}/2) \cong \mathrm{Spin}(3)/(\mathbb{Z}/2) = \mathrm{SO}(3).$$

== Finite fields ==
One can also define unitary groups over finite fields: given a field of order q, there is a non-degenerate Hermitian structure on vector spaces over $\mathbf{F}_{q^2},$ unique up to unitary congruence, and correspondingly a matrix group denoted $\mathrm{U}(n, q)$ or $\mathrm{U}(n, q^2)$ and likewise special and projective unitary groups. For convenience, this article uses the $\mathrm{U}(n, q^2)$ convention.

Recall that the group of units of a finite field is cyclic, so the group of units of $\mathbf{F}_{q^2},$ and thus the group of invertible scalar matrices in $\mathrm{GL}(n, q^2)$ is the cyclic group of order $q^2-1.$ The center of $\mathrm{U}(n, q^2)$ has order q + 1 and consists of the scalar matrices which are unitary, that is those matrices $cI_V$ with $c^{q+1}=1.$ The center of the special unitary group has order gcd(n, q + 1) and consists of those unitary scalars which also have order dividing n.

The quotient of the unitary group by its center is the projective unitary group, $\mathrm{PU}(n, q^2),$ and the quotient of the special unitary group by its center is the projective special unitary group $\mathrm{PSU}(n, q^2).$ In most cases (n ≥ 2 and $(n,q^2) \notin \{ (2,2^2), (2,3^2), (3,2^2) \}$), $\mathrm{SU}(n, q^2)$ is a perfect group and $\mathrm{PU}(n, q^2)$ is a finite simple group, (Grove 2002, Thm. 11.22 and 11.26).

== The topology of PU(H) ==
=== PU(H) is a classifying space for circle bundles ===
The same construction may be applied to matrices acting on an infinite-dimensional Hilbert space $\mathcal H$.

Let U(H) denote the space of unitary operators on an infinite-dimensional Hilbert space. When f: X → U(H) is a continuous mapping of a compact space X into the unitary group, one can use a finite dimensional approximation of its image and a simple K-theoretic trick

$$u \oplus 1_{\ell^2} \sim u \oplus 1_{\ell^2} \oplus 1_{\ell^2} \oplus \cdots \sim u \oplus u^{-1} \oplus u \oplus u^{-1} \oplus \cdots \sim 1_{\ell^2} \oplus 1_{\ell^2} \oplus \cdots, \qquad u \in {\rm U}(H),$$

to show that it is actually homotopic to the trivial map onto a single point. This means that U(H) is weakly contractible, and an additional argument shows that it is actually contractible. Note that this is a purely infinite dimensional phenomenon, in contrast to the finite-dimensional cousins U(n) and their limit U(∞) under the inclusion maps which are not contractible admitting homotopically nontrivial continuous mappings onto U(1) given by the determinant of matrices.

The center of the infinite-dimensional unitary group $\mathrm{U}(\mathcal H)$ is, as in the finite dimensional case, U(1), which again acts on the unitary group via multiplication by a phase. As the unitary group does not contain the zero matrix, this action is free. Thus $\mathrm{U}(\mathcal H)$ is a contractible space with a U(1) action, which identifies it as EU(1) and the space of U(1) orbits as BU(1), the classifying space for U(1).

=== The homotopy and (co)homology of PU(H) ===
$\mathrm{PU}(\mathcal H)$ is defined precisely to be the space of orbits of the U(1) action on $\mathrm{U}(\mathcal H)$, thus $\mathrm{PU}(\mathcal H)$ is a realization of the classifying space BU(1). In particular, using the isomorphism

$$\pi_n(X)=\pi_{n+1}(BX)$$

between the homotopy groups of a space X and the homotopy groups of its classifying space BX, combined with the homotopy type of the circle U(1)

$$\pi_k (\mathrm{U}(1)) = \begin{cases} \mathbb{Z} & k= 1 \\ 0 & k \neq 1 \end{cases}$$

we find the homotopy groups of $\mathrm{PU}(\mathcal H)$

$$\pi_k (\mathrm{PU}(\mathcal H)) = \begin{cases} \mathbb{Z} & k= 2 \\ 0 & k \neq 2 \end{cases}$$

thus identifying $\mathrm{PU}(\mathcal H)$ as a representative of the Eilenberg–MacLane space $\mathrm{K}(\mathbb{Z}, 2)$.

As a consequence, $\mathrm{PU}(\mathcal H)$ must be of the same homotopy type as the infinite-dimensional complex projective space, which also represents $\mathrm{K}(\mathbb{Z}, 2)$. This means in particular that they have isomorphic homology and cohomology groups:

$$\begin{align}
\mathrm H^{2n}(\mathrm{PU}(\mathcal H))   &= \mathrm H_{2n}(\mathrm{PU}(\mathcal H))   = \mathbb{Z} \\
\mathrm H^{2n+1}(\mathrm{PU}(\mathcal H)) &= \mathrm H_{2n+1}(\mathrm{PU}(\mathcal H)) = 0
\end{align}$$

== Representations ==
=== The adjoint representation ===
PU(n) in general has no n-dimensional representations, just as SO(3) has no two-dimensional representations.

PU(n) has an adjoint action on SU(n), thus it has an $(n^2-1)$-dimensional representation. When n = 2 this corresponds to the three dimensional representation of SO(3). The adjoint action is defined by thinking of an element of PU(n) as an equivalence class of elements of U(n) that differ by phases. One can then take the adjoint action with respect to any of these U(n) representatives, and the phases commute with everything and so cancel. Thus the action is independent of the choice of representative and so it is well-defined.

=== Projective representations ===
In many applications PU(n) does not act in any linear representation, but instead in a projective representation, which is a representation up to a phase which is independent of the vector on which one acts. These are useful in quantum mechanics, as physical states are only defined up to phase. For example, massive fermionic states transform under a projective representation but not under a representation of the little group PU(2) = SO(3).

The projective representations of a group are classified by its second integral cohomology, which in this case is

$$\mathrm H^2(\mathrm{PU}(n)) = \mathbb{Z} / n$$

or

$$\mathrm H^2(\mathrm{PU}(\mathcal H)) = \mathbb{Z}.$$

The cohomology groups in the finite case can be derived from the long exact sequence for bundles and the above fact that SU(n) is a $\mathbb{Z}/n$ bundle over PU(n). The cohomology in the infinite case was argued above from the isomorphism with the cohomology of the infinite complex projective space.

Thus PU(n) enjoys n projective representations, of which the first is the fundamental representation of its SU(n) cover, while $\mathrm{PU}(\mathcal H)$ has a countably infinite number. As usual, the projective representations of a group are ordinary representations of a central extension of the group. In this case the central extended group corresponding to the first projective representation of each projective unitary group is just the original unitary group of which we took the quotient by U(1) in the definition of PU.

== Applications ==
=== Twisted K-theory ===
The adjoint action of the infinite projective unitary group is useful in geometric definitions of twisted K-theory. Here the adjoint action of the infinite-dimensional $\mathrm{PU}(\mathcal H)$ on either the Fredholm operators or the infinite unitary group is used.

In geometrical constructions of twisted K-theory with twist H, the $\mathrm{PU}(\mathcal H)$ is the fiber of a bundle, and different twists H correspond to different fibrations. As seen below, topologically $\mathrm{PU}(\mathcal H)$ represents the Eilenberg–Maclane space $\mathrm{K}(\mathbb{Z}, 2)$, therefore the classifying space of $\mathrm{PU}(\mathcal H)$ bundles is the Eilenberg–Maclane space $\mathrm{K}(\mathbb{Z}, 3)$. $\mathrm{K}(\mathbb{Z}, 3)$ is also the classifying space for the third integral cohomology group, therefore $\mathrm{PU}(\mathcal H)$ bundles are classified by the third integral cohomology. As a result, the possible twists H of a twisted K-theory are precisely the elements of the third integral cohomology.

=== Pure Yang–Mills gauge theory ===
In the pure Yang–Mills SU(n) gauge theory, which is a gauge theory with only gluons and no fundamental matter, all fields transform in the adjoint of the gauge group SU(n). The $\mathbb{Z}/n$ center of SU(n) commutes, being in the center, with SU(n)-valued fields and so the adjoint action of the center is trivial. Therefore the gauge symmetry is the quotient of SU(n) by $\mathbb{Z}/n$, which is PU(n) and it acts on fields using the adjoint action described above.

In this context, the distinction between SU(n) and PU(n) has an important physical consequence. SU(n) is simply connected, but the fundamental group of PU(n) is $\mathbb{Z}/n$, the cyclic group of order n. Therefore a PU(n) gauge theory with adjoint scalars will have nontrivial codimension 2 vortices in which the expectation values of the scalars wind around PU(n)'s nontrivial cycle as one encircles the vortex. These vortices, therefore, also have charges in $\mathbb{Z}/n$, which implies that they attract each other and when n come into contact they annihilate. An example of such a vortex is the Douglas–Shenker string in SU(n) Seiberg–Witten gauge theories.
