= List of things named after John Horton Conway =

This is a list of things named after the English mathematician John Horton Conway (1937–2020).

- Conway algebra – an algebraic structure introduced by Paweł Traczyk and Józef H. Przytycki
- Conway's base 13 function – a function used as a counterexample to the converse of the intermediate value theorem
- Conway chained arrow notation – a notation for expressing certain extremely large numbers
- Conway circle – a geometrical construction based on extending the sides of a triangle
- Conway criterion – a criterion for identifying prototiles that admit a periodic tiling
- Conway group – any of the groups Co_{0}, Co_{1}, Co_{2}, or Co_{3}
- Conway group Co_{1} – one of the sporadic simple groups discovered by Conway in 1968
- Conway group Co_{2} – one of the sporadic simple groups discovered by Conway in 1968
- Conway group Co_{3} – one of the sporadic simple groups discovered by Conway in 1968
- Conway knot – a curious knot having the same Alexander polynomial and Conway polynomial as the unknot
- Conway notation (knot theory) – a notation invented by Conway for describing knots in knot theory
- Conway polyhedron notation – notation invented by Conway used to describe polyhedra
- Conway polynomial (finite fields) – an irreducible polynomial used in finite field theory
- Conway puzzle – a packing problem invented by Conway using rectangular blocks
- Conway sphere – a 2-sphere intersecting a given knot in the 3-sphere or 3-ball transversely in four points
- Conway triangle notation – notation which allows trigonometric functions of a triangle to be managed algebraically
- Conway's 99-graph problem – a problem invented by Conway asking if a certain undirected graph exists
- Conway sequence – a self-referential sequence in which each term describes the digits of the previous term
- Conway's constant – a constant used in the study of the Look-and-say sequence
- Conway's dead fly problem – does there exist a Danzer set whose points are separated at a bounded distance from each other?
- Conway's Game of Life – a cellular automaton defined on the two-dimensional orthogonal grid of square cells
- Conway's Soldiers – a one-person mathematical game resembling peg solitaire
- Conway's thrackle conjecture – In graph theory, the conjecture that no thrackle has more edges than vertices
- Alexander–Conway polynomial – a knot invariant which assigns a polynomial to each knot type in knot theory
