= Conway group Co1 =

Sporadic simple group

In the area of modern algebra known as group theory, the Conway group Co_{1} is a sporadic simple group of order

4,157,776,806,543,360,000
= 2^{21} · 3^{9} · 5^{4} · 7^{2} · 11 · 13 · 23
≈ 4×10^{18}.

== History and properties ==
Co_{1} is one of the 26 sporadic groups and was discovered by John Horton Conway in 1968. It is the largest of the three sporadic Conway groups and can be obtained as the quotient of Co_{0} (group of automorphisms of the Leech lattice Λ that fix the origin) by its center, which consists of the scalar matrices ±1. It also appears at the top of the automorphism group of the even 26-dimensional unimodular lattice II_{25,1}. Some rather cryptic comments in Witt's collected works suggest that he found the Leech lattice and possibly the order of its automorphism group in unpublished work in 1940.

The outer automorphism group is trivial and the Schur multiplier has order 2.

== Involutions ==
Co_{0} has 4 conjugacy classes of involutions; these collapse to 2 in Co_{1}, but there are 4-elements in Co_{0} that correspond to a third class of involutions in Co_{1}.

An image of a dodecad has a centralizer of type 2^{11}:M_{12}:2, which is contained in a maximal subgroup of type 2^{11}:M_{24}.

An image of an octad or 16-set has a centralizer of the form 2^{1+8}.O^{+}_{8}(2), a maximal subgroup.

== Representations ==
The smallest faithful permutation representation of Co_{1} is on the 98280 pairs {v,–v} of norm 4 vectors.

The double cover Co_{0} has a 24 dimensional representation; when reduced modulo 2, this becomes a representation of the simple group Co_{1}. The exterior square and symmetric tensor square of the 24 dimensional representation have dimension 276 and 299, respectively; in characteristic not 2, the former is the smallest faithful representation of the simple group Co_{1}.

The centralizer of an involution of type 2B in the monster group is of the form 2^{1+24 ·}Co_{1}. Under this subgroup, the 196883 dimensional representation of the monster reduces as follows: the 24x4096=98304 representation of 2^{1+24 ·}Co_{1}, the 98280 dimensional representation of 2^{24 ·}Co_{1}, and the 299 dimensional representation of Co_{1}.

The Dynkin diagram of the even Lorentzian unimodular lattice II_{1,25} is isometric to the (affine) Leech lattice Λ, so the group of diagram automorphisms is split extension Λ,Co_{0} of affine isometries of the Leech lattice.

== Maximal subgroups ==
Wilson (1983) found the 22 conjugacy classes of maximal subgroups of Co_{1}, though there were some errors in this list, corrected by Wilson (1988).

Maximal subgroups of Co_{1}
No.	Structure	Order	Index	Comments
1	Co_{2}	42,305,421,312,000 = 2^{18}·3^{6}·5^{3}·7·11·23	98,280 = 2^{3}·3^{3}·5·7·13	
2	3^{·}Suz:2	2,690,072,985,600 = 2^{14}·3^{8}·5^{2}·7·11·13	1,545,600 = 2^{7}·3·5^{2}·7·23	the lift to Aut(Λ) = Co_{0} fixes a complex structure or changes it to the complex conjugate structure; also, top of Suzuki chain; normalizer of a subgroup of order 3 (class 3A)
3	2^{11}:M_{24}	501,397,585,920 = 2^{21}·3^{3}·5·7·11·23	8,292,375 = 3^{6}·5^{3}·7·13	image of monomial subgroup from Aut(Λ), that subgroup stabilizing the standard frame of 48 vectors of form (±8,0^{23})
4	Co_{3}	495,766,656,000 = 2^{10}·3^{7}·5^{3}·7·11·23	8,386,560 = 2^{11}·3^{2}·5·7·13	
5	2^{1+8 ·}O^{+}_{8}(2)	89,181,388,800 = 2^{21}·3^{5}·5^{2}·7	46,621,575 = 3^{4}·5^{2}·7·11·13·23	centralizer of an involution of class 2A (image of octad from Aut(Λ))
6	Fi_{21}:S_{3} ≈ U_{6}(2):S_{3}	55,180,984,320 = 2^{16}·3^{7}·5·7·11	75,348,000 = 2^{5}·3^{2}·5^{3}·7·13·23	the lift to Aut(Λ) is the symmetry group of a coplanar hexagon of 6 type 2 points
7	(A_{4} × G_{2}(4)):2	6,038,323,200 = 2^{15}·3^{4}·5^{2}·7·13	688,564,800 = 2^{6}·3^{5}·5^{2}·7·11·23	in Suzuki chain
8	2^{2+12}:(A_{8} × S_{3})	1,981,808,640 = 2^{21}·3^{3}·5·7	2,097,970,875 = 3^{6}·5^{3}·7·11·13·23	
9	2^{4+12 ·}(S_{3} × 3.S_{6})	849,346,560 = 2^{21}·3^{4}·5	4,895,265,375 = 3^{5}·5^{3}·7^{2}·11·13·23	
10	3^{2 ·}U_{4}(3).D_{8}	235,146,240 = 2^{10}·3^{8}·5·7	17,681,664,000 = 2^{11}·3·5^{3}·7·11·13·23	
11	3^{6}:2.M_{12}	138,568,320 = 2^{7}·3^{9}·5·11	30,005,248,000 = 2^{14}·5^{3}·7^{2}·13·23	holomorph of ternary Golay code
12	(A_{5} × J_{2}):2	72,576,000 = 2^{10}·3^{4}·5^{3}·7	57,288,591,360 = 2^{11}·3^{5}·5·7·11·13·23	in Suzuki chain
13	3^{1+4}:2.S_{4}(3).2	25,194,240 = 2^{8}·3^{9}·5	165,028,864,000 = 2^{13}·5^{3}·7^{2}·11·13·23	normalizer of a subgroup of order 3 (class 3C)
14	(A_{6} × U_{3}(3)).2	4,354,560 = 2^{9}·3^{5}·5·7	954,809,856,000 = 2^{12}·3^{4}·5^{3}·7·11·13·23	in Suzuki chain
15	3^{3+4}:2.(S_{4} × S_{4})	2,519,424 = 2^{7}·3^{9}	1,650,288,640,000 = 2^{14}·5^{4}·7^{2}·11·13·23	
16	A_{9} × S_{3}	1,088,640 = 2^{7}·3^{5}·5·7	3,819,239,424,000 = 2^{14}·3^{4}·5^{3}·7·11·13·23	in Suzuki chain; normalizer of a subgroup of order 3 (class 3D)
17	(A_{7} × L_{2}(7)):2	846,720 = 2^{7}·3^{3}·5·7^{2}	4,910,450,688,000 = 2^{14}·3^{6}·5^{3}·11·13·23	in Suzuki chain
18	(D_{10} × (A_{5} × A_{5}).2).2	144,000 = 2^{7}·3^{2}·5^{3}	28,873,450,045,440 = 2^{14}·3^{7}·5·7^{2}·11·13·23	
19	5^{1+2}:GL_{2}(5)	60,000 = 2^{5}·3·5^{4}	69,296,280,109,056 = 2^{16}·3^{8}·7^{2}·11·13·23	
20	5^{3}:(4 × A_{5}).2	60,000 = 2^{5}·3·5^{4}	69,296,280,109,056 = 2^{16}·3^{8}·7^{2}·11·13·23	
21	7^{2}:(3 × 2.S_{4})	3,528 = 2^{3}·3^{2}·7^{2}	1,178,508,165,120,000 = 2^{18}·3^{7}·5^{4}·11·13·23	
22	5^{2}:2A_{5}	3,000 = 2^{3}·3·5^{3}	1,385,925,602,181,120 = 2^{18}·3^{8}·5·7^{2}·11·13·23	
