= Miracle Octad Generator =

Mathematical tool

In mathematics, the Miracle Octad Generator, or MOG, is a mathematical tool introduced by Rob T. Curtis for studying the Mathieu groups, binary Golay code and Leech lattice.

== Description ==
The Miracle Octad Generator is a 4x6 array of combinations describing any point in 24-dimensional space. It preserves all of the symmetries and maximal subgroups of the Mathieu group M_{24}. It can therefore be used to study all of these symmetries.

== Golay code ==
Another use for the Miracle Octad Generator is to quickly verify codewords of the binary Golay code. Each element of the Miracle Octad Generator can store either a '1' or a '0', usually displayed as an asterisk and blank space, respectively. Each column and the top row have a property known as the count, which is the number of asterisks in that particular line. One of the criteria for a set of 24 coordinates to be a codeword in the binary Golay code is for all seven counts to be of the same parity. The other restriction is that the scores of each column form a word in the hexacode. The score of a column can be either 0, 1, ω, or ω-bar, depending on its contents. The score of a column is evaluated by the following rules:

- If a column contains exactly one asterisk, it has a score of 0 if it resides in the top row, 1 if it is in the second row, ω for the third row, and ω-bar for the bottom row.
- Simultaneously complementing every bit in a column does not affect its score.
- Complementing the bit in the top row does not affect its score, either.

A codeword can be derived from just its top row and score, which proves that there are exactly 4096 codewords in the binary Golay code.

== MiniMOG ==
John Horton Conway developed a 4 × 3 array known as the MiniMOG. The MiniMOG provides the same function for the Mathieu group M_{12} and ternary Golay code as the Miracle Octad Generator does for M_{24} and binary Golay code, respectively. Instead of using a quaternary hexacode, the MiniMOG uses a ternary tetracode.
