= Umbral moonshine =

Topic in group theory and harmonic analysis (Niemeier lattice-mock theta connection)

In mathematics, umbral moonshine is a mysterious connection between Niemeier lattices and Ramanujan's mock theta functions. It is a generalization of the Mathieu moonshine phenomenon connecting representations of the Mathieu group M24 with K3 surfaces.

The usage of the term "umbral" in this context is unrelated to the umbral calculus.

== Mathieu moonshine ==
The prehistory of Mathieu moonshine starts with a theorem of Mukai, asserting that any group of symplectic automorphisms of a K3 surface embeds in the Mathieu group M23. The moonshine observation arose from physical considerations: any K3 sigma-model conformal field theory has an action of the N=(4,4) superconformal algebra, arising from a hyperkähler structure. When Tohru Eguchi, Hirosi Ooguri, and Yuji Tachikawa (2011) computed the first few terms of the decomposition of the elliptic genus of a K3 CFT into characters of the N=(4,4) superconformal algebra, they found that the multiplicities matched well with simple combinations of representations of M24. However, by the Mukai–Kondo classification, there is no faithful action of this group on any K3 surface by symplectic automorphisms, and by work of Gaberdiel–Hohenegger–Volpato, there is no faithful action on any K3 CFT, so the appearance of an action on the underlying Hilbert space is still a mystery.

Eguchi and Hikami showed that the N=(4,4) multiplicities are mock modular forms, and Miranda Cheng suggested that characters of elements of M24 should also be mock modular forms. This suggestion became the Mathieu moonshine conjecture, asserting that the virtual representation of N=(4,4) given by the K3 elliptic genus is an infinite dimensional graded representation of M24 with non-negative multiplicities in the massive sector, and that the characters are mock modular forms. In 2012, Terry Gannon proved that the representation of M24 exists.

== Umbral moonshine ==
In 2012, Cheng, Duncan & Harvey (2012) amassed numerical evidence of an extension of Mathieu moonshine, where families of mock modular forms were attached to divisors of 24. After some group-theoretic discussion with Glauberman, Cheng, Duncan & Harvey (2013) found that this earlier extension was a special case (the A-series) of a more natural encoding by Niemeier lattices. For each Niemeier root system $X$, with corresponding lattice $L^X$, they defined an umbral group $G^X$, given by the quotient of the automorphism group of L^{X} by the subgroup of reflections- these are also known as the stabilizers of deep holes in the Leech lattice. They conjectured that for each $X$, there is an infinite dimensional graded representation $G^X$ of $G^X$, such that the characters of elements are given by a list of vector-valued mock modular forms that they computed. The candidate forms satisfy minimality properties quite similar to the genus-zero condition for Monstrous moonshine. These minimality properties imply the mock modular forms are uniquely determined by their shadows, which are vector-valued theta series constructed from the root system. The special case where X is the $A_1^{24}$ root system yields precisely Mathieu Moonshine. The umbral moonshine conjecture has been proved in Duncan, Griffin & Ono (2015).

The name of umbral moonshine derives from the use of shadows in the theory of mock modular forms. Other moonlight-related words like 'lambency' were given technical meanings (in this case, the genus zero group attached to a shadow $S^X$, whose level is the dual Coxeter number of the root system $X$) by Cheng, Duncan, and Harvey to continue the theme.

Although the umbral moonshine conjecture has been settled, there are still many questions that remain. For example, connections to geometry and physics are still not very solid, although there is work relating umbral functions to duVal singularities on K3 surfaces by Cheng and Harrison. As another example, the current proof of the umbral moonshine conjecture is ineffective, in the sense that it does not give natural constructions of the representations. This is similar to the situation with monstrous moonshine during the 1980s: Atkin, Fong, and Smith showed by computation that a moonshine module exists in 1980, but did not give a construction. The effective proof of the Conway-Norton conjecture was given by Borcherds in 1992, using the monster representation constructed by Frenkel, Lepowsky, and Meurman. There is a vertex algebra construction for the $E_8^3$ case by Duncan and Harvey, where $G^X$ is the symmetric group $S_3$. However, the algebraic structure is given by an asymmetric cone gluing construction, suggesting that it is not the last word.

== See also ==
- Monstrous moonshine
