= Savitsky =

Savitsky (Belarusian: Савіцкі; Ukrainian: Сави́цький or Савіцький; Russian: Савицкий); other transliterations: Savicki, Savicky, Savitski, Savitskiy, Savitzky, Sawicki, Sawitzki, Sawizkii), feminine: Savitska or Savitskaya, is a Slavic surname. Notable bearers include:

- Abraham Savitzky (1919–1999), American analytical chemist
- Aleksandr Savitsky (born 1971), Kazakhstani swimmer
- Bella Savitsky Abzug (1920–1998), American lawyer, congresswoman and social activist
- Dmitri Savitski (1944-2019), Russian writer and poet
- George Savitsky (1924–2012), American football offensive tackle
- Günter Sawitzki (1932–2020), German footballer
- Igor Savitsky (1915–1984), Soviet painter, archaeologist and collector
- Konstantin Savitsky (1844–1905), Russian realist painter
- Mikhail Savicki (1922–2010), Belarusian painter
- Pavel Savitsky (born 1994), Belarusian footballer
- Silvestre Savitski, Russian-Colombian communist
- Svetlana Savitskaya (born 1948), Soviet aviator and cosmonaut
- Valentin Grigorievich Savitsky, Soviet submarine captain
- Yevgeniy Savitskiy (1910–1990), Soviet aviator

== See also ==
- Savickas
- Savickis
- Sawicki
- Savitsky Museum
- 4303 Savitskij
- Savitzky–Golay smoothing filter
