= Sawicki =

Sawicki (Polish: [saˈvitski]; feminine Sawicka, plural Sawiccy) is a Polish surname. Other language equivalents:

Language	Masculine	Feminine
Polish	Sawicki	Sawicka
Belarusian (Romanization)	Савіцкі (Savitski, Savicki)	Савіцкая (Savitskaya, Savitskaia, Savickaja)
Latvian	Savickis	
Lithuanian	Savickas	Savickienė (married); Savickaitė (unmarried)
Russian (Romanization)	Савицкий (Savitsky, Savitskiy)	Савицкая (Savitskaya, Savitskaia)
Ukrainian (Romanization)	Савицький (Savytskyy, Savytskyi)	Савицька (Savytska)
Other	Savitzky, Sawitzky, Stawicki, Sawizky	

== People ==
- Agata Sawicka (born 1985), Polish volleyball player
- Beata Dorota Sawicka (born 1964), Polish politician
- Hanna Sawicka (1917–1943), Polish-Jewish communist
- Irena Sawicka (1890–1944), Polish educator and WWII resistance member
- Jaclyn Sawicki (born 1992), footballer
- Janet Sawicki, American cancer researcher
- Joan Sawicki (born 1945), Canadian politician
- Marek Sawicki (born 1958), Polish politician
- Miroslaw Sawicki (1946–2016), Polish politician
- Olga Sawicka (1932–2015), Polish dancer
- Wojciech Sawicki (born 1955), Secretary General of the Parliamentary Assembly of the Council of Europe
- Wiktor Sawicki, Polish runner
