= McLaughlin group =

McLaughlin group may refer to:

- McLaughlin sporadic group, in mathematical group theory
- The McLaughlin Group, weekly public affairs talk show TV program in the United States
