= Mathieu group M24 =

Sporadic simple group

In the area of modern algebra known as group theory, the Mathieu group M_{24} is a sporadic simple group of order

244,823,040 = 2^{10} · 3^{3} · 5 · 7 · 11 · 23
≈ 2×10^{8}.

== History and properties ==
M_{24} is one of the 26 sporadic groups and was introduced by Mathieu (1861, 1873). It is a 5-transitive permutation group on 24 objects. The Schur multiplier and the outer automorphism group are both trivial.

The Mathieu groups can be constructed in various ways. Initially, Mathieu and others constructed them as permutation groups. It was difficult to see that M_{24} actually existed, that its generators did not just generate the alternating group A_{24}. The matter was clarified when Ernst Witt constructed M_{24} as the automorphism (symmetry) group of an S(5,8,24) Steiner system W_{24} (the Witt design). M_{24} is the group of permutations that map every block in this design to some other block. The subgroups M_{23} and M_{22} then are easily defined to be the stabilizers of a single point and a pair of points respectively.

=== Construction as a permutation group ===
M_{24} is the subgroup of S_{24} that is generated by the three permutations:

- $(1,2,3,4,5,6,7,8,9,10,11,12,13,14,15,16,17,18,19,20,21,22,23)$
- $(3,17,10,7,9)(4,13,14,19,5)(8,18,11,12,23)(15,20,22,21,16)$ and
- $(1,24)(2,23)(3,12)(4,16)(5,18)(6,10)(7,20)(8,14)(9,21)(11,17)(13,22)(15,19)$.

M_{24} can also be generated by two permutations:

- $(1,16,8,23,13,14,5)(2,7,11,19,20,24,12)(3,4,17,9,22,21,15)$ and
- $(1,24)(2,21)(3,10)(4,22)(5,9)(6,23)(7,8)(11,18)(12,20)(13,14)(15,19)(16,17).$

Another construction uses two permutations based on simple automorphisms of the Golay code.

- (1, 2, 3)(4, 5, 6)(7, 8, 9)(10, 11, 12)(13, 14, 15)(16, 17, 18)(19, 20, 21)(22, 23, 24)
- (1, 2, 3, 4, 5, 15, 19, 11, 10, 9, 12, 7, 13, 14, 23, 24, 17, 18, 22, 6, 21, 8, 20)(16)

The pair of generating permutations of M_{24} presented above.

=== M_{24} from PSL(3,4) ===
M_{24} can be built starting from PSL(3,4), the projective special linear group of 3-dimensional space over the finite field with 4 elements (Dixon & Mortimer 1996, pp. 192–205). This group, sometimes called M_{21}, acts on the projective plane over the field F_{4}, an S(2,5,21) system called W_{21}. Its 21 blocks are called lines. Any 2 lines intersect at one point.

M_{21} has 168 simple subgroups of order 360 and 360 simple subgroups of order 168. In the larger projective general linear group PGL(3,4) both sets of subgroups form single conjugacy classes, but in M_{21} both sets split into 3 conjugacy classes. The subgroups respectively have orbits of 6, called hyperovals, and orbits of 7, called Fano subplanes. These sets allow creation of new blocks for larger Steiner systems. M_{21} is normal in PGL(3,4), of index 3. PGL(3,4) has an outer automorphism induced by transposing conjugate elements in F_{4} (the field automorphism). PGL(3,4) can therefore be extended to the group PΓL(3,4) of projective semilinear transformations, which is a split extension of M_{21} by the symmetric group S_{3}. PΓL(3,4) has an embedding as a maximal subgroup of M_{24}.(Griess 1998, p. 55)

A hyperoval has no 3 points that are collinear. A Fano subplane likewise satisfies suitable uniqueness conditions.

To W_{21} append 3 new points and let the automorphisms in PΓL(3,4) but not in M_{21} permute these new points. An S(3,6,22) system W_{22} is formed by appending just one new point to each of the 21 lines and new blocks are 56 hyperovals conjugate under M_{21}.

An S(5,8,24) system would have 759 blocks, or octads. Append all 3 new points to each line of W_{21}, a different new point to the Fano subplanes in each of the sets of 120, and append appropriate pairs of new points to all the hyperovals. That accounts for all but 210 of the octads. Those remaining octads are subsets of W_{21} and are symmetric differences of pairs of lines. There are many possible ways to expand the group PΓL(3,4) to M_{24}.

=== Automorphism group of the Golay code ===
The group M_{24} also is the permutation automorphism group of the binary Golay code W, i.e., the group of permutations of coordinates mapping W to itself. Codewords correspond in a natural way to subsets of a set of 24 objects. (In coding theory the term "binary Golay code" often refers to a shorter related length 23 code, and the length 24 code used here is called the "extended binary Golay code".) Those subsets corresponding to codewords with 8 or 12 coordinates equal to 1 are called octads or dodecads respectively. The octads are the blocks of an S(5,8,24) Steiner system and the binary Golay code is the vector space over field F_{2} spanned by the octads of the Steiner system.

The simple subgroups M_{23}, M_{22}, M_{12}, and M_{11} can be defined as subgroups of M_{24}, stabilizers respectively of a single coordinate, an ordered pair of coordinates, a dodecad, and a dodecad together with a single coordinate.

There is a natural connection between the Mathieu groups and the larger Conway groups, because the binary Golay code and the Leech lattice both lie in spaces of dimension 24. The Conway groups in turn are found in the Monster group. Robert Griess refers to the 20 sporadic groups found in the Monster as the Happy Family, and to the Mathieu groups as the first generation.

=== Polyhedral symmetries ===
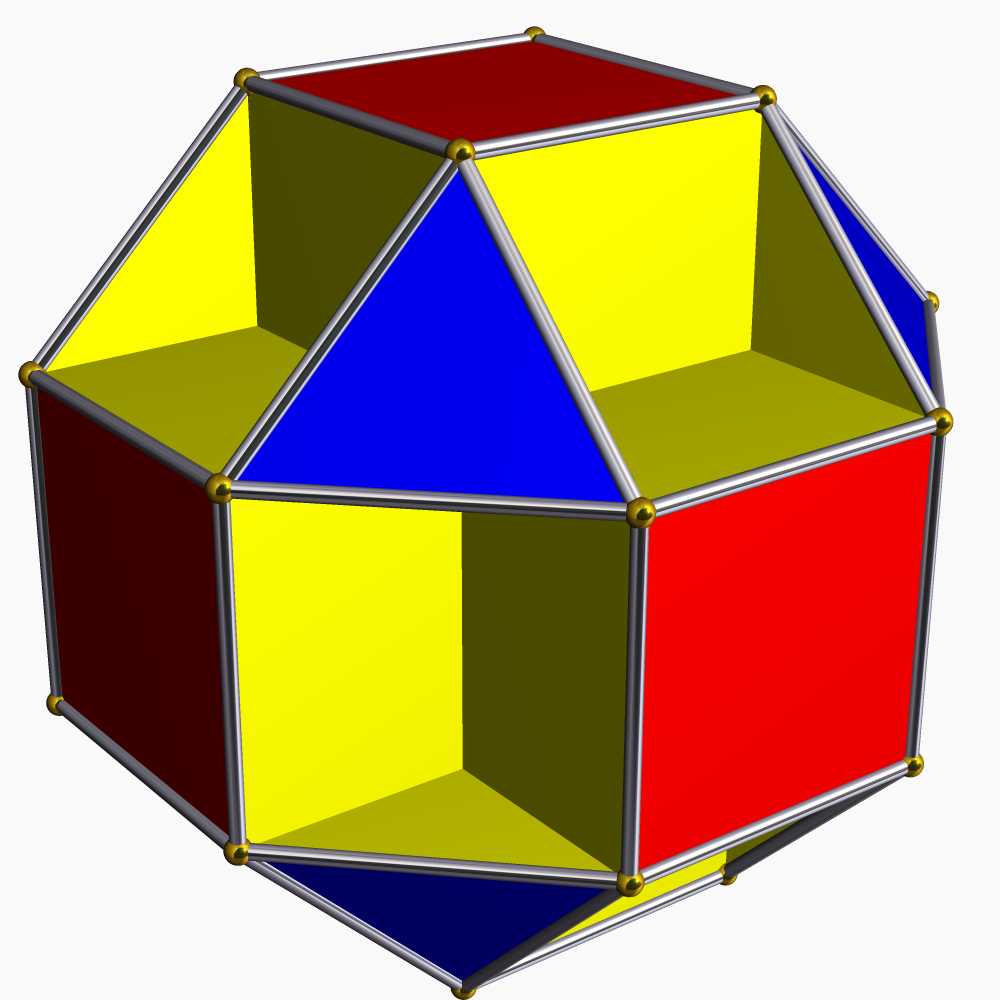
M_{24} can be constructed from symmetries of the Klein quartic, augmented by a (non-geometric) symmetry of its immersion as the small cubicuboctahedron.

M_{24} can be constructed starting from the symmetries of the Klein quartic (the symmetries of a tessellation of the genus three surface), which is PSL(2,7), which can be augmented by an additional permutation. This permutation can be described by starting with the tiling of the Klein quartic by 56 triangles (with 24 vertices – the 24 points on which the group acts), then forming squares of out some of the 2 triangles, and octagons out of 6 triangles, with the added permutation being "interchange the two endpoints of those edges of the original triangular tiling which bisect the squares and octagons". This can be visualized by coloring the triangles – the corresponding tiling is topologically but not geometrically the t_{0,1}{4, 3, 3} tiling, and can be (polyhedrally) immersed in Euclidean 3-space as the small cubicuboctahedron (which also has 24 vertices).

== Applications ==
The theory of umbral moonshine is a partly conjectural relationship between K3 surfaces and M_{24}.

The Conway group Co1, the Fischer group Fi24, and the Janko group J4 each have maximal subgroups that are an extension of the Mathieu group M_{24} by a group 2^{11}. (These extensions are not all the same.)

== Representations ==
Frobenius (1904) calculated the complex character table of M_{24}.

The Mathieu group M_{24} has a 5-fold transitive permutation representation on 24 points. The corresponding linear representation over the complex numbers is the sum of the trivial representation and a 23-dimensional irreducible representation.

M_{24} has two rank 3 permutation representations: one on the 276 = 1+44+231 pairs of points (or duads) with stabilizer M_{22}.2, and one on the 1288 = 1+495+792 duads, with stabilizer M_{12}.2.

The quotient of the 24-dimensional linear representation of the permutation representation by its 1-dimensional fixed subspace gives a 23-dimensional representation, which is irreducible over any field of characteristic not 2 or 3, and gives the smallest faithful representation over such fields.

Reducing the 24-dimensional representation mod 2 gives an action on F^{24}_{2}. This has invariant subspaces of dimension 1, 12 (the Golay code), and 23. The subquotients give two irreducible representations of dimension 11 over the field with 2 elements.

== Maximal subgroups ==
Choi (1972b) found the 9 conjugacy classes of maximal subgroups of M_{24}. Curtis (1977) gave a short proof of the result, describing the 9 classes in terms of combinatorial data on the 24 points: the subgroups fix a point, duad, octad, duum, sextet, triad, trio, projective line, or octern, as described below. Todd (1966) gave the character tables of M_{24} (originally calculated by Frobenius (1904)) and the 8 maximal subgroups that were known at the time.

M_{24} contains non-abelian simple subgroups of 13 isomorphism types: five classes of A_{5}, four classes of PSL(3,2), two classes of A_{6}, two classes of PSL(2,11), one class each of A_{7}, PSL(2,23), M_{11}, PSL(3,4), A_{8}, M_{12}, M_{22}, M_{23}, and M_{24}. A_{6} is also noted below as a subquotient in the sextet subgroup.

The Mathieu group acts on the 2048 = 1+759+1288 points of the Golay code modulo the fixed space with 3 orbits, and on the 4096 = 1+24+276+2024+1771 points of the cocode with 5 orbits, and the subgroups fixing a non-trivial point of the code or cocode give 6 of the 9 classes of maximal subgroups.

The 9 classes of maximal subgroups are as follows:

=== Point subgroup ===
The subgroup fixing a point is M_{23}, order 10200960.

=== Duad subgroup ===
A duad is a pair of points. The subgroup fixing a duad is M_{22}:2, order 887040, with orbits of 2 and 22.

=== Octad subgroup ===
The subgroup fixing one of the 759 (= 3·11·23) octads of the Golay code or Steiner system is the octad group 2^{4}:A_{8}, order 322560, with orbits of size 8 and 16. The linear group GL(4,2) has an exceptional isomorphism to the alternating group A_{8}. The pointwise stabilizer O of an octad is an abelian group of order 16, exponent 2, each of whose involutions moves all 16 points outside the octad. The stabilizer of the octad is a split extension of O by A_{8}. (Thompson 1983, pp. 197–208)

=== Duum subgroup ===
A duum is a pair of complementary dodecads (12 point sets) in the Golay code. The subgroup fixing a duad is M_{12}:2, order 190080, transitive and imprimitive. This subgroup was discovered by Frobenius. The subgroup M_{12} acts differently on 2 sets of 12, reflecting the outer automorphism of M_{12}.

=== Sextet subgroup ===
2^{6}:(3.S_{6}), order 138240: sextet group

Consider a tetrad, any set of 4 points in the Steiner system W_{24}. An octad is determined by choice of a fifth point from the remaining 20. There are 5 octads possible. Hence any tetrad determines a partition into 6 tetrads, called a sextet, whose stabilizer in M_{24} is called a sextet group.

The total number of tetrads is 24*23*22*21/4! = 23*22*21. Dividing that by 6 gives the number of sextets, 23*11*7 = 1771. Furthermore, a sextet group is a subgroup of a wreath product of order 6!*(4!)^{6}, whose only prime divisors are 2, 3, and 5. Now we know the prime divisors of |M_{24}|. Further analysis would determine the order of the sextet group and hence |M_{24}|.

It is convenient to arrange the 24 points into a 6-by-4 array:

A E I M Q U

B F J N R V

C G K O S W

D H L P T X

Moreover, it is convenient to use the elements of the field F_{4} to number the rows: 0, 1, u, u^{2}.

The sextet group has a normal abelian subgroup H of order 64, isomorphic to the hexacode, a vector space of length 6 and dimension 3 over F_{4}. A non-zero element in H does double transpositions within 4 or 6 of the columns. Its action can be thought of as addition of vector co-ordinates to row numbers.

The sextet group is a split extension of H by a group 3.S_{6} (a stem extension). Here is an instance within the Mathieu groups where a simple group (A_{6}) is a subquotient, not a subgroup. 3.S_{6} is the normalizer in M_{24} of the subgroup generated by r=(BCD)(FGH)(JKL)(NOP)(RST)(VWX), which can be thought of as a multiplication of row numbers by u^{2}. The subgroup 3.A_{6} is the centralizer of ⟨r⟩. Generators of 3.A_{6} are:

(AEI)(BFJ)(CGK)(DHL)(RTS)(VWX) (rotating first 3 columns)
(AQ)(BS)(CT)(DR)(EU)(FX)(GV)(HW)
(AUEIQ)(BXGKT)(CVHLR)(DWFJS) (product of preceding two)
(FGH)(JLK)(MQU)(NRV)(OSW)(PTX) (rotating last 3 columns).

An odd permutation of columns, say (CD)(GH)(KL)(OP)(QU)(RV)(SX)(TW), then generates 3.S_{6}.

The group 3.A_{6} is isomorphic to a subgroup of SL(3,4) whose image in PSL(3,4) has been noted above as the hyperoval group.

The applet Moggie has a function that displays sextets in color.

=== Triad subgroup ===
A triad is a set of 3 points. The subgroup fixing a triad is PSL(3,4):S_{3}, order 120960, with orbits of size 3 and 21.

=== Trio subgroup ===
A trio is a set of 3 disjoint octads of the Golay code. The subgroup fixing a trio is the trio group 2^{6}:(PSL(2,7) x S_{3}), order 64512, transitive and imprimitive.

=== Projective line subgroup ===
The subgroup fixing a projective line structure on the 24 points is PSL(2,23), order 6072, whose action is doubly transitive. This subgroup was observed by Mathieu.

=== Octern subgroup ===
An octern is a certain partition of the 24 points into 8 blocks of 3. The subgroup fixing an octern is the octern group isomorphic to PSL(2,7), of order 168, simple, transitive and imprimitive. It was the last maximal subgroup of M_{24} to be found.

The table below lists all the maximal subgroups.

Maximal subgroups of M_{24}
No.	Structure	Order	Index	Comments
1	M_{23}	10,200,960 = 2^{7}·3^{2}·5·7·11·23	24 = 2^{3}·3	Point subgroup
2	M_{22}:2	887,040 = 2^{8}·3^{2}·5·7·11	276 = 2^{2}·3·23	Duad subgroup
3	2^{4}:A_{8}	322,560 = 2^{10}·3^{2}·5·7	759 = 3·11·23	Octad subgroup
4	M_{12}:2	190,080 = 2^{7}·3^{3}·5·11	1,288 = 2^{3}·7·23	Duum subgroup
5	2^{6}:3^{·}S_{6}	138,240 = 2^{10}·3^{3}·5	1,771 = 7·11·23	Sextet subgroup
6	L_{3}(4):S_{3}	120,960 = 2^{7}·3^{3}·5·7	2,024 = 2^{3}·11·23	Triad subgroup
7	2^{6}:(L_{3}(2) × S_{3})	64,512 = 2^{10}·3^{2}·7	3,795 = 3·5·11·23	Trio subgroup
8	L_{2}(23)	6,072 = 2^{3}·3·11·23	40,320 = 2^{7}·3^{2}·5·7	Projective line subgroup
9	L_{2}(7)	168 = 2^{3}·3·7	1,457,280 = 2^{7}·3^{2}·5·11·23	Octern subgroup

== Conjugacy classes ==
There are 26 conjugacy classes. The cycle shapes are all balanced in the sense that they remain invariant under changing length k cycles to length N/k cycles for some integer N depending on the conjugacy class.

Order	No. elements	Cycle structure	
1 = 1	1	1^{24}	
2 = 2	11385 = 3^{2} · 5 · 11 · 23	1^{8}2^{8}	
2 = 2	31878 = 2 · 3^{2} · 7 · 11 · 23	2^{12}	
3 = 3	226688 = 2^{7} · 7 · 11 · 23	1^{6}3^{6}	
3 = 3	485760 = 2^{7} · 3 · 5 · 11 · 23	3^{8}	
4 = 2^{2}	637560 = 2^{3} · 3^{2} · 5 · 7 · 11 · 23	2^{4}4^{4}	
4 = 2^{2}	1912680 = 2^{3} · 3^{3} · 5 · 7 · 11 · 23	1^{4}2^{2}4^{4}	
4 = 2^{2}	2550240 = 2^{5} · 3^{2} · 5 · 7 · 11 · 23	4^{6}	
5 = 5	4080384 = 2^{8} · 3^{3} · 7 · 11 · 23	1^{4}5^{4}	
6 = 2 · 3	10200960 = 2^{7} · 3^{2} · 5 · 7 · 11 · 23	1^{2}2^{2}3^{2}6^{2}	
6 = 2 · 3	10200960 = 2^{7} · 3^{2} · 5 · 7 · 11 · 23	6^{4}	
7 = 7	5829120 = 2^{9} · 3^{2} · 5 · 11 · 23	1^{3}7^{3}	power equivalent
7 = 7	5829120 = 2^{9} · 3^{2} · 5 · 11 · 23	1^{3}7^{3}	power equivalent
8 = 2^{3}	15301440 = 2^{6} · 3^{3} · 5 · 7 · 11 · 23	1^{2}2·4·8^{2}	
10 = 2 · 5	12241152 = 2^{8} · 3^{3} · 7 · 11 · 23	2^{2}10^{2}	
11 = 11	22256640 = 2^{10} · 3^{3} · 5 · 7 · 23	1^{2}11^{2}	
12 = 2^{2} · 3	20401920 = 2^{8} · 3^{2} · 5 · 7 · 11 · 23	2 ·4·6·12	
12 = 2^{2} · 3	20401920 = 2^{8} · 3^{2} · 5 · 7 · 11 · 23	12^{2}	
14 = 2 · 7	17487360 = 2^{9} · 3^{3} · 5 · 11 · 23	1·2·7·14	power equivalent
14 = 2 · 7	17487360 = 2^{9} · 3^{3} · 5 · 11 · 23	1·2·7·14	power equivalent
15 = 3 · 5	16321536 = 2^{10} · 3^{2} · 7 · 11 · 23	1·3·5·15	power equivalent
15 = 3 · 5	16321536 = 2^{10} · 3^{2} · 7 · 11 · 23	1·3·5·15	power equivalent
21 = 3 · 7	11658240 = 2^{10} · 3^{2} · 5 · 11 · 23	3·21	power equivalent
21 = 3 · 7	11658240 = 2^{10} · 3^{2} · 5 · 11 · 23	3·21	power equivalent
23 = 23	10644480 = 2^{10} · 3^{3} · 5 · 7 · 11	1·23	power equivalent
23 = 23	10644480 = 2^{10} · 3^{3} · 5 · 7 · 11	1·23	power equivalent
