= Conway notation =

Conway notation may refer to the following notations created by John Horton Conway:

- Conway chained arrow notation
- Conway notation (knot theory)
- Conway polyhedron notation
- Conway triangle notation
- Orbifold notation
