= Lexicographic code =

Type of error-correcting codes

Lexicographic codes or lexicodes are a group of error-correcting codes produced independently by Vladimir Levenshtein and by John Horton Conway and Neil Sloane in 1960 and 1986, respectively. The binary lexicographic codes are linear codes, and include the Hamming codes and the binary Golay codes.

== Construction ==
A lexicode of length n and minimum distance d over a finite field is generated by starting with the all-zero vector and iteratively adding the next vector (in lexicographic order) of minimum Hamming distance d from the vectors added so far. As an example, the length-3 lexicode of minimum distance 2 would consist of the vectors marked by an "X" in the following example:

Vector	In code?
000	X
001	
010	
011	X
100	
101	X
110	X
111	

Here is a table of all n-bit lexicode by d-bit minimal hamming distance, resulting of maximum 2^{m} codewords dictionary. For example, F_{4} code (n=4,d=2,m=3), extended Hamming code (n=8,d=4,m=4) and especially Golay code (n=24,d=8,m=12) shows exceptional compactness compared to neighbors.

n \ d	1	2	3	4	5	6	7	8	9	10	11	12	13	14	15	16	17	18
1	1																	
2	2	1																
3	3	2	1															
4	4	3	1	1														
5	5	4	2	1	1													
6	6	5	3	2	1	1												
7	7	6	4	3	1	1	1											
8	8	7	4	4	2	1	1	1										
9	9	8	5	4	2	2	1	1	1									
10	10	9	6	5	3	2	1	1	1	1								
11	11	10	7	6	4	3	2	1	1	1	1							
12	12	11	8	7	4	4	2	2	1	1	1	1						
13	13	12	9	8	5	4	3	2	1	1	1	1	1					
14	14	13	10	9	6	5	4	3	2	1	1	1	1	1				
15	15	14	11	10	7	6	5	4	2	2	1	1	1	1	1			
16	16	15	11	11	8	7	5	5	2	2	1	1	1	1	1	1		
17	17	16	12	11	9	8	6	5	3	2	2	1	1	1	1	1	1	
18	18	17	13	12	9	9	7	6	3	3	2	2	1	1	1	1	1	1
19	19	18	14	13	10	9	8	7	4	3	2	2	1	1	1	1	1	1
20	20	19	15	14	11	10	9	8	5	4	3	2	2	1	1	1	1	1
21	21	20	16	15	12	11	10	9	5	5	3	3	2	2	1	1	1	1
22	22	21	17	16	12	12	11	10	6	5	4	3	2	2	1	1	1	1
23	23	22	18	17	13	12	12	11	6	6	5	4	2	2	2	1	1	1
24	24	23	19	18	14	13	12	12	7	6	5	5	3	2	2	2	1	1
25	25	24	20	19	15	14	12	12	8	7	6	5	3	3	2	2	1	1
26	26	25	21	20	16	15	12	12	9	8	7	6	4	3	2	2	2	1
27	27	26	22	21	17	16	13	12	9	9	7	7	5	4	3	2	2	2
28	28	27	23	22	18	17	13	13	10	9	8	7	5	5	3	3	2	2
29	29	28	24	23	19	18	14	13	11	10	8	8	6	5	4	3	2	2
30	30	29	25	24	19	19	15	14	12	11	9	8	6	6	5	4	2	2
31	31	30	26	25	20	19	16	15	12	12	10	9	6	6	6	5	3	2
32	32	31	26	26	21	20	16	16	13	12	11	10	7	6	6	6	3	3
33	...	32	...	26	...	21	...	16	...	13	...	11	...	7	...	6	...	3

All odd d-bit lexicode distances are exact copies of the even d+1 bit distances minus the last dimension, so an odd-dimensional space can never create something new or more interesting than the d+1 even-dimensional space above.

Since lexicodes are linear, they can also be constructed by means of their basis.

== Implementation ==
Following C generate lexicographic code and parameters are set for the Golay code (N=24, D=8).

#include <stdio.h>
#include <stdlib.h>
int main() {                /* GOLAY CODE generation */
    int i, j, k;                                                                    
                                                                                    
    int _pc[1<<16] = {0};         // PopCount Macro
    for (i=0; i < (1<<16); i++)                                                     
    for (j=0; j < 16; j++)                                                          
        _pc[i] += (i>>j)&1;
#define pc(X) (_pc[(X)&0xffff] + _pc[((X)>>16)&0xffff])
                                                                                    
#define N 24 // N bits
#define D 8  // D bits distance
    unsigned int * z = malloc(1<<29);
    for (i=j=0; i < (1<<N); i++)      
    {                             // Scan all previous
        for (k=j-1; k >= 0; k--)  // lexicodes.
            if (pc(z[k]^i) < D)   // Reverse checking
                break;            // is way faster...
                                                                                    
        if (k == -1) {            // Add new lexicode
            for (k=0; k < N; k++) // & print it
                printf("%d", (i>>k)&1);                                             
            printf(" : %d\n", j);                                                   
            z[j++] = i;                                                             
        }                                                                           
    }                                                                               
}

== Combinatorial game theory ==
The theory of lexicographic codes is closely connected to combinatorial game theory. In particular, the codewords in a binary lexicographic code of distance d encode the winning positions in a variant of Grundy's game, played on a collection of heaps of stones, in which each move consists of replacing any one heap by at most d − 1 smaller heaps, and the goal is to take the last stone.
