= Conway group Co3 =

Sporadic simple group

In the area of modern algebra known as group theory, the Conway group $\mathrm{Co}_3$ is a sporadic simple group of order

495,766,656,000
= 2^{10} · 3^{7} · 5^{3} · 7 · 11 · 23
≈ 5×10^{11}.

== History and properties ==
$\mathrm{Co}_3$ is one of the 26 sporadic groups and was discovered by John Horton Conway (1968, 1969) as the group of automorphisms of the Leech lattice $\Lambda$ fixing a lattice vector of type 3, thus length √6. It is thus a subgroup of $\mathrm{Co}_0$. It is isomorphic to a subgroup of $\mathrm{Co}_1$. The direct product $2\times \mathrm{Co}_3$ is maximal in $\mathrm{Co}_0$.

The Schur multiplier and the outer automorphism group are both trivial.

== Representations ==
Co_{3} acts on a 23-dimensional even lattice with no roots, given by the orthogonal complement of a norm 6 vector of the Leech lattice. This gives 23-dimensional representations over any field; over fields of characteristic 2 or 3 this can be reduced to a 22-dimensional faithful representation.

Co_{3} has a doubly transitive permutation representation on 276 points.

Walter Feit (1974) showed that if a finite group has an absolutely irreducible faithful rational representation of dimension 23 and has no subgroups of index 23 or 24 then it is contained in either $\Z/2\Z \times \mathrm{Co}_2$ or $\Z/2\Z \times \mathrm{Co}_3$.

== Maximal subgroups ==
Some maximal subgroups fix or reflect 2-dimensional sublattices of the Leech lattice. It is usual to define these planes by h-k-l triangles: triangles including the origin as a vertex, with edges (differences of vertices) being vectors of types h, k, and l.

Larry Finkelstein (1973) found the 14 conjugacy classes of maximal subgroups of $\mathrm{Co}_3$ as follows:

Maximal subgroups of Co_{3}
No.	Structure	Order	Index	Comments
1	McL:2	1,796,256,000 = 2^{8}·3^{6}·5^{3}·7·11	276 = 2^{2}·3·23	McL fixes a 2-2-3 triangle. The maximal subgroup also includes reflections of the triangle. $\mathrm{Co}_3$ has a doubly transitive permutation representation on 276 type 2-2-3 triangles having as an edge a type 3 vector fixed by $\mathrm{Co}_3$.
2	HS	44,352,000 = 2^{9}·3^{2}·5^{3}·7·11	11,178 = 2·3^{5}·23	fixes a 2-3-3 triangle
3	U_{4}(3).2^{2}	13,063,680 = 2^{9}·3^{6}·5·7	37,950 = 2·3·5^{2}·11·23	
4	M_{23}	10,200,960 = 2^{7}·3^{2}·5·7·11·23	48,600 = 2^{3}·3^{5}·5^{2}	fixes a 2-3-4 triangle
5	3^{5}:(2 × M_{11})	3,849,120 = 2^{5}·3^{7}·5·11	128,800 = 2^{5}·5^{2}·7·23	fixes or reflects a 3-3-3 triangle
6	2^{·}Sp_{6}(2)	2,903,040 = 2^{10}·3^{4}·5·7	170,775 = 3^{3}·5^{2}·11·23	centralizer of an involution of class 2A (trace 8), which moves 240 of the 276 type 2-2-3 triangles
7	U_{3}(5):S_{3}	756,000 = 2^{5}·3^{3}·5^{3}·7	655,776 = 2^{5}·3^{4}·11·23	
8	3^{1+4}_{+}:4S_{6}	699,840 = 2^{6}·3^{7}·5	708,400 = 2^{4}·5^{2}·7·11·23	normalizer of a subgroup of order 3 (class 3A)
9	2^{4·}A_{8}	322,560 = 2^{10}·3^{2}·5·7	1,536,975 = 3^{5}·5^{2}·11·23	
10	PSL(3,4):(2 × S_{3})	241,920 = 2^{8}·3^{3}·5·7	2,049,300 = 2^{2}·3^{4}·5^{2}·11·23	
11	2 × M_{12}	190,080 = 2^{7}·3^{3}·5·11	2,608,200 = 2^{3}·3^{4}·5^{2}·7·23	centralizer of an involution of class 2B (trace 0), which moves 264 of the 276 type 2-2-3 triangles
12	[2^{10}.3^{3}]	27,648 = 2^{10}·3^{3}	17,931,375 = 3^{4}·5^{3}·7·11·23	
13	S_{3} × PSL(2,8):3	9,072 = 2^{4}·3^{4}·7	54,648,000 = 2^{6}·3^{3}·5^{3}·11·23	normalizer of a subgroup of order 3 (class 3C, trace 0)
14	A_{4} × S_{5}	1,440 = 2^{5}·3^{2}·5	344,282,400 = 2^{5}·3^{5}·5^{2}·7·11·23	

== Conjugacy classes ==
Traces of matrices in a standard 24-dimensional representation of Co_{3} are shown. The names of conjugacy classes are taken from the Atlas of Finite Group Representations. The cycle structures listed act on the 276 2-2-3 triangles that share the fixed type 3 side.

Class	Order of centralizer	Size of class	Trace	Cycle type	
1A	all Co_{3}	1	24		
2A	2,903,040	3^{3}·5^{2}·11·23	8	1^{36},2^{120}	
2B	190,080	2^{3}·3^{4}·5^{2}·7·23	0	1^{12},2^{132}	
3A	349,920	2^{5}·5^{2}·7·11·23	-3	1^{6},3^{90}	
3B	29,160	2^{7}·3·5^{2}·7·11·23	6	1^{15},3^{87}	
3C	4,536	2^{7}·3^{3}·5^{3}·11·23	0	3^{92}	
4A	23,040	2·3^{5}·5^{2}·7·11·23	-4	1^{16},2^{10},4^{60}	
4B	1,536	2·3^{6}·5^{3}·7·11·23	4	1^{8},2^{14},4^{60}	
5A	1500	2^{8}·3^{6}·7·11·23	-1	1,5^{55}	
5B	300	2^{8}·3^{6}·5·7·11·23	4	1^{6},5^{54}	
6A	4,320	2^{5}·3^{4}·5^{2}·7·11·23	5	1^{6},3^{10},6^{40}	
6B	1,296	2^{6}·3^{3}·5^{3}·7·11·23	-1	2^{3},3^{12},6^{39}	
6C	216	2^{7}·3^{4}·5^{3}·7·11·23	2	1^{3},2^{6},3^{11},6^{38}	
6D	108	2^{8}·3^{4}·5^{3}·7·11·23	0	1^{3},2^{6},3^{3},6^{42}	
6E	72	2^{7}·3^{5}·5^{3}·7·11·23	0	3^{4},6^{44}	
7A	42	2^{9}·3^{6}·5^{3}·11·23	3	1^{3},7^{39}	
8A	192	2^{4}·3^{6}·5^{3}·7·11·23	2	1^{2},2^{3},4^{7},8^{30}	
8B	192	2^{4}·3^{6}·5^{3}·7·11·23	-2	1^{6},2,4^{7},8^{30}	
8C	32	2^{5}·3^{7}·5^{3}·7·11·23	2	1^{2},2^{3},4^{7},8^{30}	
9A	162	2^{9}·3^{3}·5^{3}·7·11·23	0	3^{2},9^{30}	
9B	81	2^{10}·3^{3}·5^{3}·7·11·23	3	1^{3},3,9^{30}	
10A	60	2^{8}·3^{6}·5^{2}·7·11·23	3	1,5^{7},10^{24}	
10B	20	2^{8}·3^{7}·5^{2}·7·11·23	0	1^{2},2^{2},5^{2},10^{26}	
11A	22	2^{9}·3^{7}·5^{3}·7·23	2	1,11^{25}	power equivalent
11B	22	2^{9}·3^{7}·5^{3}·7·23	2	1,11^{25}	power equivalent
12A	144	2^{6}·3^{5}·5^{3}·7·11·23	-1	1^{4},2,3^{4},6^{3},12^{20}	
12B	48	2^{6}·3^{6}·5^{3}·7·11·23	1	1^{2},2^{2},3^{2},6^{4},12^{20}	
12C	36	2^{8}·3^{5}·5^{3}·7·11·23	2	1,2,3^{5},4^{3},6^{3},12^{19}	
14A	14	2^{9}·3^{7}·5^{3}·11·23	1	1,2,7^{5}14^{17}	
15A	15	2^{10}·3^{6}·5^{2}·7·11·23	2	1,5,15^{18}	
15B	30	2^{9}·3^{6}·5^{2}·7·11·23	1	3^{2},5^{3},15^{17}	
18A	18	2^{9}·3^{5}·5^{3}·7·11·23	2	6,9^{4},18^{13}	
20A	20	2^{8}·3^{7}·5^{2}·7·11·23	1	1,5^{3},10^{2},20^{12}	power equivalent
20B	20	2^{8}·3^{7}·5^{2}·7·11·23	1	1,5^{3},10^{2},20^{12}	power equivalent
21A	21	2^{10}·3^{6}·5^{3}·11·23	0	3,21^{13}	
22A	22	2^{9}·3^{7}·5^{3}·7·23	0	1,11,22^{12}	power equivalent
22B	22	2^{9}·3^{7}·5^{3}·7·23	0	1,11,22^{12}	power equivalent
23A	23	2^{10}·3^{7}·5^{3}·7·11	1	23^{12}	power equivalent
23B	23	2^{10}·3^{7}·5^{3}·7·11	1	23^{12}	power equivalent
24A	24	2^{7}·3^{6}·5^{3}·7·11·23	-1	1^{2}4,6,12^{2}24^{10}	
24B	24	2^{7}·3^{6}·5^{3}·7·11·23	1	2,3^{2},4,12^{2},24^{10}	
30A	30	2^{9}·3^{6}·5^{2}·7·11·23	0	1,5,15^{2},30^{8}	

== Generalized Monstrous Moonshine ==
In analogy to monstrous moonshine for the monster M, for Co_{3}, the relevant McKay-Thompson series is $T_{4A}(\tau)$ where one can set the constant term a(0) = 24 (OEIS: A097340),

$$\begin{align}j_{4A}(\tau)
&=T_{4A}(\tau)+24\\
&=\Big(\tfrac{\eta^2(2\tau)}{\eta(\tau)\,\eta(4\tau)} \Big)^{24} \\
&=\Big(\big(\tfrac{\eta(\tau)}{\eta(4\tau)}\big)^{4}+4^2 \big(\tfrac{\eta(4\tau)}{\eta(\tau)}\big)^{4}\Big)^2\\
&=\frac{1}{q} + 24+ 276q + 2048q^2 +11202q^3+49152q^4+\dots
\end{align}$$

and η(τ) is the Dedekind eta function.
