= Savickis =

- Lithuanian surname
- m.: Savickis
- f.: (unmarried): Savickytė
- f.: (married): Savickienė
- Related names: Sawicki, Savitsky, Savickis

Savickis is a Lithuanian and Latvian language surname derived from the Slavic surname Savitsky. The Latvian feminine form is Savicka.

Notable people with this surname include:

- Jurgis Savickis (1890–1952), Lithuanian short story writer and diplomat
- Nelė Savickytė, maiden name of Nelė Žilinskienė (born 1969), Lithuanian high jumper
- Ungars Savickis (1952–2018), Latvian composer and sound director

== See also ==
- Savickas
