= Savickas =

- Lithuanian surname
- m.: Savickas
- f.: (unmarried): Savickaitė
- f.: (married): Savickienė
- Related names: Sawicki, Savitsky, Savickis

Savickas is the Lithuanian family name derived from the Slavic surname, Sawicki (Polish), Savitsky (Russian), Savitski (Belarusian). Notable people with this surname include:

- Arūnas Savickas (born 1975), Lithuanian swimmer
- Eglė Savickaitė (born 2004), Lithuanian cross-country skier
- Frank Savickas (1935–2001), American politician
- Klaudija Savickaitė, Lithuanian footballer
- Konstantinas Savickas (1908–1992), American lawyer and Lithuanian basketball coach
- Žydrūnas Savickas (born 1975), Lithuanian strongman
- Žydrūnas Savickas (cyclist)

== See also ==
- Savickis
