= Joseph Carvalko Jr. =

American technologist

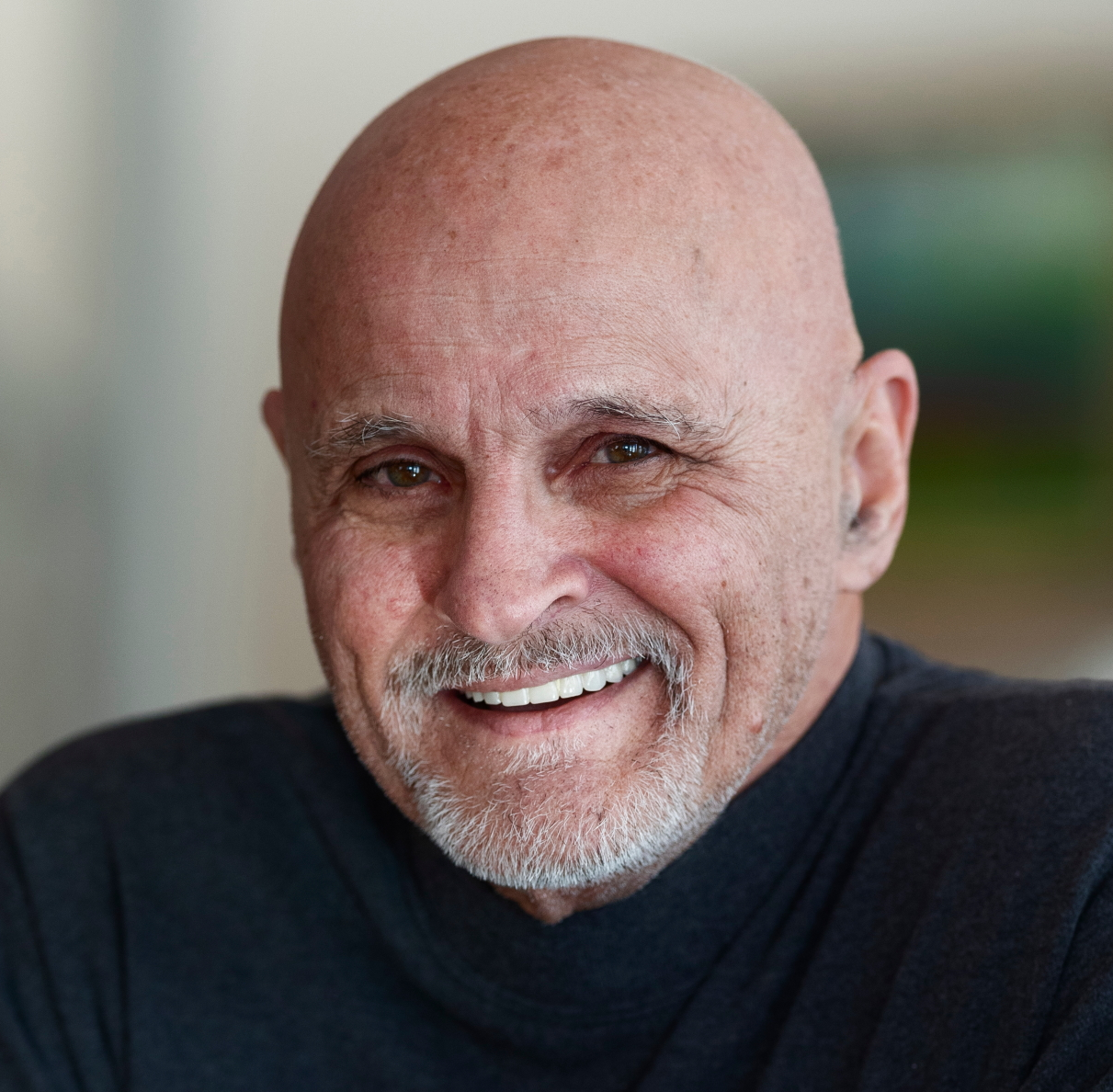
- Education: Bachelor of Science in Electrical Engineering, a Juris Doctor from Quinnipiac University, and later a Master in Fine Arts from Fairfield University
- Occupations: technologist, academic, patent lawyer, and writer

Joseph Carvalko Jr. is an American technologist, academic, patent lawyer and writer. As an inventor and engineer, Carvalko has been awarded eighteen U.S. patents in various fields, including computer technology, biomedical, fuel purification, and financial systems. He has authored academic books and articles throughout his career. In 2019, he was appointed to chair the Technology and Ethics Working Group, Interdisciplinary Center for Bioethics, Yale University.

== Biography ==
Carvalko was born and raised in the northeastern United States. He served in the U.S. Air Force as a B-47 bomber radar fire control technician from 1959 through 1964. After his discharge he continued his education, receiving a B.S. in Electrical Engineering and a Master in Fine Arts at Fairfield University, in addition to a Juris Doctor at Quinnipiac University.

In the mid-1960s, Carvalko assisted inventor Emil Bolsey in the development of an image tracking system that was used by the Lunar Orbiter spacecraft in photographing landing sites for the Apollo Space missions that would later land on the Moon.

In the 1970s, he assisted Marcel J. E. Golay and Kendall Preston develop television microscopes and artificial intelligence technologies for Perkin-Elmer. Since 1980 he has practiced law, first admitted to the Connecticut bar and the U.S. patent bar in 1980, and then admitted to the New York bar in 1989.

Since 2005, he has been an adjunct professor of law at Quinnipiac University School of Law, teaching law, science and technology. In 2018 he served as a faculty member at Yale University's Interdisciplinary Center for Bioethics.

As a member, ABA, Section of Science & Technology Law, he served on the editorial board, SciTech Lawyer. From 1989 to 1996 he served the ABA in a leadership position as chair, Behavioral Sciences Committee. As a member, Institute Electrical, Electronic, Engineers (IEEE), Society on Social Implications of Technology, he serves as associate editor of IEEE Society and Technology magazine.

Carvalko is a frequent contributor of papers and articles about artificial intelligence and the future of posthuman technology. His engagements include science/technology forums as a presenter, moderator or keynote speaker, interviewee on podcasts and blogs, press and television.

According to Google Scholar Carvalko's patents, and his articles, books on science, technology, and law have been cited over 1384 times, garnering an h-index of 14 and an i10-index rating of 15. He has also written extensively on the future of technology cyborg, posthuman, and dystopian themes.

As a trial attorney Carvalko has been lead attorney or a member of a trial team in cases throughout his career. He served as the lead trial attorney who prosecuted the U.S. government for concealing that it left American POWs in North Korea following the 1953 Armistice. The trial resulted in a Federal District Court judgment, which was the first of its kind to order the Army to change the classification of a soldier from Missing in Action to a Prisoners of War. The trial was the subject of a Congressional investigation and subsequent hearing in 1995-96, where Carvalko's client, the POW's brother, testified about the trial before the United States House of Representatives, Committee on National Security, Military Personnel Subcommittee, Washington, DC, Thursday, June 20, 1996. In 2005, a documentary recounting the trial and congressional hearing, entitled Missing, Presumed Dead: The Search For America's POWs, featured actor Ed Asner as narrator, Carvalko, as the lawyer who tried the case among others.

Carvalko's inventions deal with a range of technologies used in copiers, medical arts, fuel filtering and artificial intelligence as it relates to remote sensing for smart buildings and vehicles. Among one of his inventions was in response to the death of UK's Princess Diana, killed in an accident as she fled the paparazzi. Carvalko invented a device to thwart successful photographing. He appeared in a documentary produced by the Associated Press. Other inventions, such as Carvalko's fuel purifier, covered under U.S Pat. No. 6,432,298, have been sold under the ALXZKA brand to the transportation and marine industry.

Carvalko has also produced works in the creative writing genres of novels and poetry, where he frequently returns to historical, cultural and dystopian themes. We Were Beautiful Once, Chapters from a Cold War, is a novel inspired by his involvement in revealing that the US government abandoned POWs in North Korea following the cessation of hostilities in 1953. His Death by Internet considers how social media might create a virtual colosseum, where life or death of an individual depends on a vote of the masses, who agree or disagree with a social or political point of view. The novel was a 2014 finalist in the Military Writers Society of America award for historical fiction. His poetry has appeared in numerous publications, such as The Flare Flagler Review, and University Press of Colorado. His poem The Road Home won third-place finalist, in the Esurance Poetry prize, 2012.

== Selected works ==
=== Books ===
- Conserving Humanity at the Dawn of Posthuman Technology (2019)
- The Techno-Human Shell: A Jump in the Evolutionary Gap (2012)
- We Were Beautiful Once, Chapters from the Cold War, a Novel (2013)
- The Science and Technology Guidebook for Lawyers (2014) – with Cara Morris
- Death By Internet, a Novel (2016)
- A Road Once Traveled (2015)

=== Short stories ===
- "Road to Suwon" (2014)
- "Crossing the Evolutionary Gap" (2016)

=== Poetry collections ===
- A Deadly Fog (2004)
- Behind the Steel (2015)
- Detras Del Acero (2015)
