= Conway circle theorem =

Geometrical construction based on extending the sides of a triangle

A triangle's Conway circle with its six concentric points (solid black), the triangle's incircle (dashed gray), and the centre of both circles (white); solid and dashed line segments of the same colour are equal in length

In plane geometry, the Conway circle theorem states that when the sides meeting at each vertex of a triangle are extended by the length of the opposite side, the six endpoints of the three resulting line segments lie on a circle whose centre is the incentre of the triangle. The circle on which these six points lie is called the Conway circle of the triangle. The theorem and circle are named after mathematician John Horton Conway.

== Proof ==
segments of equal color are of equal length $$\begin{align}\triangle IF_cP_a &\cong \triangle IF_cQ_b \cong \triangle IF_aP_b \\ &\cong \triangle IF_aQ_c \cong \triangle IF_bP_c \\ &\cong \triangle IF_bQ_a \\ \Rightarrow \, |IP_a|&=|IQ_a|=|IP_b|=|IQ_b|\\ &=|IP_c|=|IQ_c| \end{align}$$

Let I be the center of the incircle of triangle ABC, r its radius and F_{a}, F_{b} and F_{c} the three points where the incircle touches the triangle sides a, b and c. Since the (extended) triangle sides are tangents of the incircle it follows that IF_{a}, IF_{b} and IF_{c} are perpendicular to a, b and c. Furthermore, the following equalities for line segments hold. |AF_{c}|=|AF_{b}|, |BF_{c}|=|BF_{a}|, |CF_{a}|=|CF_{b}|. With that the six triangles IF_{c}P_{a}, IF_{c}Q_{b}, IF_{a}P_{b}, IF_{a}Q_{c}, IF_{b}Q_{a} and IF_{b}P_{c} all have a side of length |AF_{c}|+|BF_{c}|+|CF_{a}| and a side of length r with a right angle between them. This means that due SAS congruence theorem for triangles all six triangles are congruent, which yields |IP_{a}|=|IQ_{a}|=|IP_{b}|=|IQ_{b}|=|IP_{c}|=|IQ_{c}|. So the six points P_{a}, Q_{a}, P_{b}, Q_{b}, P_{c} and Q_{c} have all the same distance from the triangle incenter I, that is they lie on a common circle with center I.

== Additional properties ==
The radius of the Conway circle is

$$\sqrt{r^2 + s^2}=\sqrt{\frac{a^2b+ab^2+b^2c+bc^2+a^2c+ac^2+abc}{a+b+c}}$$

where $r$ and $s$ are the inradius and semiperimeter of the triangle.

== Generalisation ==
Conway's circle theorem as a special case of the generalisation, called "side divider theorem" (Villiers) or "windscreen wiper theorem" (Polster))

Conway's circle is a special case of a more general circle for a triangle that can be obtained as follows: Given any △ABC with an arbitrary point P on line AB. Construct BQ = BP, CR = CQ, AS = AR, BT = BS, CU = CT. Then AU = AP, and PQRSTU is cyclic.

If you place P on the extended triangle side AB such that BP=b and BP being completely outside the triangle then the above constructions yield Conway's circle theorem.

== See also ==
- List of things named after John Horton Conway
