= Conway group =

Four finite groups derived from the Leech lattice

In the area of modern algebra known as group theory, the Conway groups are the three sporadic simple groups Co_{1}, Co_{2} and Co_{3} along with the related finite group Co_{0} introduced by (Conway 1968, 1969).

The largest of the Conway groups, Co_{0}, is the group of automorphisms of the Leech lattice Λ with respect to addition and inner product. It has order

8,315,553,613,086,720,000 = 16! 6! 4! 23

but it is not a simple group. The simple group Co_{1} of order

4,157,776,806,543,360,000 = 2^{21} · 3^{9} · 5^{4} · 7^{2} · 11 · 13 · 23

is defined as the quotient of Co_{0} by its center, which consists of the scalar matrices ±1. The groups Co_{2} of order

42,305,421,312,000 = 2^{18} · 3^{6} · 5^{3} · 7 · 11 · 23

and Co_{3} of order

495,766,656,000 = 2^{10} · 3^{7} · 5^{3} · 7 · 11 · 23

consist of the automorphisms of Λ fixing a lattice vector of type 2 and type 3, respectively. As the scalar −1 fixes no non-zero vector, these two groups are isomorphic to subgroups of Co_{1}.

The inner product on the Leech lattice is defined as 1/8 the sum of the products of respective co-ordinates of the two multiplicand vectors; it is an integer. The square norm of a vector is its inner product with itself, always an even integer. It is common to speak of the type of a Leech lattice vector: half the square norm. Subgroups are often named in reference to the types of relevant fixed points. This lattice has no vectors of type 1.

== History ==
Thomas Thompson (1983) relates how, in about 1964, John Leech investigated close packings of spheres in Euclidean spaces of large dimension. One of Leech's discoveries was a lattice packing in 24-space, based on what came to be called the Leech lattice Λ. He wondered whether his lattice's symmetry group contained an interesting simple group, but felt he needed the help of someone better acquainted with group theory. He had to do much asking around because the mathematicians were pre-occupied with agendas of their own. John Conway agreed to look at the problem. John G. Thompson said he would be interested if he were given the order of the group. Conway expected to spend months or years on the problem, but found results in just a few sessions.

Witt (1998, page 329) stated that he found the Leech lattice in 1940 and hinted that he calculated the order of its automorphism group Co_{0}.

== Monomial subgroup N of Co_{0} ==
Conway started his investigation of Co_{0} with a subgroup he called N, a holomorph of the (extended) binary Golay code (as diagonal matrices with 1 or −1 as diagonal elements) by the Mathieu group M_{24} (as permutation matrices). N ≈ 2^{12}:M_{24}.

A standard representation, used throughout this article, of the binary Golay code arranges the 24 co-ordinates so that 6 consecutive blocks (tetrads) of 4 constitute a sextet.

The matrices of Co_{0} are orthogonal; i. e., they leave the inner product invariant. The inverse is the transpose. Co_{0} has no matrices of determinant −1.

The Leech lattice can easily be defined as the Z-module generated by the set Λ_{2} of all vectors of type 2, consisting of

(4, 4, 0^{22})
(2^{8}, 0^{16})
(−3, 1^{23})

and their images under N. Λ_{2} under N falls into 3 orbits of sizes 1104, 97152, and 98304. Then |Λ_{2}| = 196,560 = 2^{4}⋅3^{3}⋅5⋅7⋅13. Conway strongly suspected that Co_{0} was transitive on Λ_{2}, and indeed he found a new matrix, not monomial and not an integer matrix.

Let η be the 4-by-4 matrix

$$\frac{1}{2}\begin{pmatrix}
1 &  -1 & -1 & -1 \\
-1 &   1 & -1 & -1 \\
-1 &  -1 &  1 & -1 \\
-1 &  -1 & -1 &  1
\end{pmatrix}$$

Now let ζ be a block sum of 6 matrices: odd numbers each of η and −η. ζ is a symmetric and orthogonal matrix, thus an involution. Some experimenting shows that it interchanges vectors between different orbits of N.

To compute |Co_{0}| it is best to consider Λ_{4}, the set of vectors of type 4. Any type 4 vector is one of exactly 48 type 4 vectors congruent to each other modulo 2Λ, falling into 24 orthogonal pairs {v, –v}. A set of 48 such vectors is called a frame or cross. N has as an orbit a standard frame of 48 vectors of form (±8, 0^{23}). The subgroup fixing a given frame is a conjugate of N. The group 2^{12}, isomorphic to the Golay code, acts as sign changes on vectors of the frame, while M_{24} permutes the 24 pairs of the frame. Co_{0} can be shown to be transitive on Λ_{4}. Conway multiplied the order 2^{12}|M_{24}| of N by the number of frames, the latter being equal to the quotient |Λ_{4}|/48 = 8,292,375 = 3^{6}⋅5^{3}⋅7⋅13. That product is the order of any subgroup of Co_{0} that properly contains N; hence N is a maximal subgroup of Co_{0} and contains 2-Sylow subgroups of Co_{0}. N also is the subgroup in Co_{0} of all matrices with integer components.

Since Λ includes vectors of the shape (±8, 0^{23}), Co_{0} consists of rational matrices whose denominators are all divisors of 8.

The smallest non-trivial representation of Co_{0} over any field is the 24-dimensional one coming from the Leech lattice, and this is faithful over fields of characteristic other than 2.

== Involutions in Co_{0} ==
Any involution in Co_{0} can be shown to be conjugate to an element of the Golay code. Co_{0} has 4 conjugacy classes of involutions.

A permutation matrix of shape 2^{12} can be shown to be conjugate to a dodecad. Its centralizer has the form 2^{12}:M_{12} and has conjugates inside the monomial subgroup. Any matrix in this conjugacy class has trace 0.

A permutation matrix of shape 2^{8}1^{8} can be shown to be conjugate to an octad; it has trace 8. This and its negative (trace −8) have a common centralizer of the form (2^{1+8}×2).O_{8}^{+}(2), a subgroup maximal in Co_{0}.

== Sublattice groups ==
Conway and Thompson found that four recently discovered sporadic simple groups, described in conference proceedings (Brauer & Sah 1969), were isomorphic to subgroups or quotients of subgroups of Co_{0}.

Conway himself employed a notation for stabilizers of points and subspaces where he prefixed a dot. Exceptional were .0 and .1, being Co_{0} and Co_{1}. For integer n ≥ 2 let .n denote the stabilizer of a point of type n (see above) in the Leech lattice.

Conway then named stabilizers of planes defined by triangles having the origin as a vertex. Let .hkl be the pointwise stabilizer of a triangle with edges (differences of vertices) of types h, k and l. The triangle is commonly called an h-k-l triangle. In the simplest cases Co_{0} is transitive on the points or triangles in question and stabilizer groups are defined up to conjugacy.

Conway identified .322 with the McLaughlin group McL (order 898,128,000) and .332 with the Higman–Sims group HS (order 44,352,000); both of these had recently been discovered.

Here is a table of some sublattice groups:

Name	Order	Structure	Example vertices
•2	2^{18} 3^{6} 5^{3} 7 11 23	Co_{2}	(−3, 1^{23})
•3	2^{10} 3^{7} 5^{3} 7 11 23	Co_{3}	(5, 1^{23})
•4	2^{18} 3^{2} 5 7 11 23	2^{11}:M_{23}	(8, 0^{23})
•222	2^{15} 3^{6} 5 7 11	PSU_{6}(2) ≈ Fi_{21}	(4, −4, 0^{22}), (0, −4, 4, 0^{21})
•322	2^{7} 3^{6} 5^{3} 7 11	McL	(5, 1^{23}),(4, 4, 0^{22})
•332	2^{9} 3^{2} 5^{3} 7 11	HS	(5, 1^{23}), (4, −4, 0^{22})
•333	2^{4} 3^{7} 5 11	3^{5} M_{11}	(5, 1^{23}), (0, 2^{12}, 0^{11})
•422	2^{17} 3^{2} 5 7 11	2^{10}:M_{22}	(8, 0^{23}), (4, 4, 0^{22})
•432	2^{7} 3^{2} 5 7 11 23	M_{23}	(8, 0^{23}), (5, 1^{23})
•433	2^{10} 3^{2} 5 7	2^{4}.A_{8}	(8, 0^{23}), (4, 2^{7}, −2, 0^{15})
•442	2^{12} 3^{2} 5 7	2^{1+8}.A_{7}	(8, 0^{23}), (6, −2^{7}, 0^{16})
•443	2^{7} 3^{2} 5 7	M_{21}:2 ≈ PSL_{3}(4):2	(8, 0^{23}), (5, −3, −3, 1^{21})

== Two other sporadic groups ==
Two sporadic subgroups can be defined as quotients of stabilizers of structures on the Leech lattice. Identifying R^{24} with C^{12} and Λ with

$$\mathbf{Z}\left[e^{\frac{2}{3}\pi i}\right]^{12},$$

the resulting automorphism group (i.e., the group of Leech lattice automorphisms preserving the complex structure) when divided by the six-element group of complex scalar matrices, gives the Suzuki group Suz (order 448,345,497,600). This group was discovered by Michio Suzuki in 1968.

A similar construction gives the Hall–Janko group J_{2} (order 604,800) as the quotient of the group of quaternionic automorphisms of Λ by the group ±1 of scalars.

The seven simple groups described above comprise what Robert Griess calls the second generation of the Happy Family, which consists of the 20 sporadic simple groups found within the Monster group. Several of the seven groups contain at least some of the five Mathieu groups, which comprise the first generation.

== Suzuki chain of product groups ==
Co_{0} has 4 conjugacy classes of elements of order 3. In M_{24} an element of shape 3^{8} generates a group normal in a copy of S_{3}, which commutes with a simple subgroup of order 168. A direct product PSL(2,7) × S_{3} in M_{24} permutes the octads of a trio and permutes 14 dodecad diagonal matrices in the monomial subgroup. In Co_{0} this monomial normalizer 2^{4}:PSL(2,7) × S_{3} is expanded to a maximal subgroup of the form 2.A_{9} × S_{3}, where 2.A_{9} is the double cover of the alternating group A_{9}.

John Thompson pointed out it would be fruitful to investigate the normalizers of smaller subgroups of the form 2.A_{n} (Conway 1971, p. 242). Several other maximal subgroups of Co_{0} are found in this way. Moreover, two sporadic groups appear in the resulting chain.

There is a subgroup 2.A_{8} × S_{4}, the only one of this chain not maximal in Co_{0}. Next there is the subgroup (2.A_{7} × PSL_{2}(7)):2. Next comes (2.A_{6} × SU_{3}(3)):2. The unitary group SU_{3}(3) (order 6,048) possesses a graph of 36 vertices, in anticipation of the next subgroup. That subgroup is (2.A_{5} o 2.HJ):2, in which the Hall–Janko group HJ makes its appearance. The aforementioned graph expands to the Hall–Janko graph, with 100 vertices. Next comes (2.A_{4} o 2.G_{2}(4)):2, G_{2}(4) being an exceptional group of Lie type.

The chain ends with 6.Suz:2 (Suz=Suzuki sporadic group), which, as mentioned above, respects a complex representation of the Leech Lattice.

== Generalized Monstrous Moonshine ==
Conway and Norton suggested in their 1979 paper that monstrous moonshine is not limited to the monster. Larissa Queen and others subsequently found that one can construct the expansions of many Hauptmoduln from simple combinations of dimensions of sporadic groups. For the Conway groups, the relevant McKay–Thompson series is $T_{2A}(\tau)$ = {1, 0, 276, −2,048, 11,202, −49,152, ...} (OEIS: A007246) and $T_{4A}(\tau)$ = {1, 0, 276, 2,048, 11,202, 49,152, ...} (OEIS: A097340) where one can set the constant term a(0) = 24,

$$\begin{align}
j_{4A}(\tau)
&= T_{4A}(\tau) + 24 \\
&= \left(\frac{\eta^2(2\tau)}{\eta(\tau)\,\eta(4\tau)}\right)^{24} \\
&= \left(\left(\frac{\eta(\tau)}{\eta(4\tau)}\right)^4 + 4^2 \left(\frac{\eta(4\tau)}{\eta(\tau)}\right)^4\right)^2 \\
&= \frac{1}{q} + 24 + 276q + 2048q^2 + 11202q^3 + 49152q^4 + \dots
\end{align}$$

and η(τ) is the Dedekind eta function.
