= Abraham Savitzky =

American analytical chemist

Abraham Savitzky (May 29, 1919 in New York City – February 5, 1999 in Naples, Florida) was an American analytical chemist.

== Biography ==
Savitzky received his bachelor's degree from the New York State College for Teachers (now University at Albany, SUNY) in 1941. After serving in the U.S. Air Force during World War II, he obtained a master's degree in 1947 and a Ph.D. in 1949 in physical chemistry from Columbia University. While at Columbia, he co-invented the Savitzky-Halford ratio recording spectrophotometer, which was manufactured by Perkin-Elmer as the Model 13. In 1950, after working at Columbia for a year as a research associate in electron microscopy, he began a long career with the Perkin-Elmer Corporation, where he was hired by Vincent J. Coates. Savitzky started with Perkin-Elmer as a staff scientist who was chiefly concerned with the design and development of infrared instruments. He rapidly moved up the ranks in the corporation. By 1956 he was named Perkin-Elmer's new product coordinator for the Instrument Division, and as the years passed, he continued to gain more and more recognition for his work in the company. Most of his work with Perkin-Elmer focused on computer-aided analytical chemistry, data reduction, infrared spectroscopy, time-sharing systems, and computer plotting. He retired from Perkin-Elmer in 1985, where he had worked for 35 years, the last 10 as a principal scientist. After his retirement Savitzky became the president of Silvermine Resources, which was concerned mostly with microprocessor-based computing systems for analytical instrumentation and bibliographic information retrieval, where he remained for several years.

Abraham Savitzky specialized in the computerization of analytical instrumentation, more specifically in the digital processing of infrared spectra and was awarded seven patents in that field. During his long career he presented numerous papers and wrote several manuscripts. Among them and while employed by Perkin-Elmer, Savitzky presented a paper describing the Savitzky–Golay Smoothing Filter for digital filtering. This paper, which is the collaborative effort of Savitzky and Marcel J. E. Golay, is one of the most famous, respected, and heavily cited articles in its field.

In recognition of his many significant accomplishments in the field of analytical chemistry and computer science, he received the Honorary Membership Award of the Society for Applied Spectroscopy in 1996, the Williams–Wright Award from the Coblentz Society in 1986. Savitzky was also a member of the American Chemical Society, the American Physics Society, the Optical Society of America, and many other professional organizations. He died in 1999. The Savitzky Family Science and Technology Book Fund was created at the Wilton (Connecticut) Public Library, honoring Abe and Evelyn.
