= Conway algebra =

Algebraic structure

In mathematics, a Conway algebra, introduced by Paweł Traczyk and Józef H. Przytycki (1988) and named after John Horton Conway, is an algebraic structure with two binary operations | and * and an infinite number of constants a_{1}, a_{2},..., satisfying certain identities. Conway algebras can be used to construct invariants of links that are skein invariant.
