= McLaughlin sporadic group =

Sporadic simple group

In the area of modern algebra known as group theory, the McLaughlin group McL is a sporadic simple group of order

898,128,000 = 2^{7} ⋅ 3^{6} ⋅ 5^{3} ⋅ 7 ⋅ 11
≈ 9×10^{8}.

== History and properties ==
McL is one of the 26 sporadic groups and was discovered by Jack McLaughlin (1969) as an index 2 subgroup of a rank 3 permutation group acting on the McLaughlin graph with 275 = 1 + 112 + 162 vertices. It fixes a 2-2-3 triangle in the Leech lattice and thus is a subgroup of the Conway groups Co_{0}, Co_{2} and Co_{3}. Its Schur multiplier has order 3, and its outer automorphism group has order 2. The group 3.McL:2 is a maximal subgroup of the Lyons group.

McL has one conjugacy class of involution (element of order 2), whose centralizer is a maximal subgroup of type 2.A_{8}. This has a center of order 2; the quotient modulo the center is isomorphic to the alternating group A_{8}.

== Representations ==
In the Conway group Co_{3}, McL has the normalizer McL:2, which is maximal in Co_{3}.

McL has 2 classes of maximal subgroups isomorphic to the Mathieu group M_{22}. An outer automorphism interchanges the two classes of M_{22} groups. This outer automorphism is realized on McL embedded as a subgroup of Co_{3}.

A convenient representation of M_{22} is in permutation matrices on the last 22 coordinates; it fixes a 2-2-3 triangle with vertices the origin and the type 2 points x = (−3, 1^{23}) and y = (−4,-4,0^{22})'. The triangle's edge x-y = (1, 5, 1^{22}) is type 3; it is fixed by a Co_{3}. This M_{22} is the monomial, and a maximal, subgroup of a representation of McL.

Wilson (2009) (p. 207) shows that the subgroup McL is well-defined. In the Leech lattice, suppose a type 3 point v is fixed by an instance of $\mathrm{Co}_3$. Count the type 2 points w such that the inner product v·w = 3 (and thus v-w is type 2). He shows their number is 552 = 2^{3}⋅3⋅23 and that this Co_{3} is transitive on these w.

|McL| = |Co3|/552 = 898,128,000.

McL is the only sporadic group to admit irreducible representations of quaternionic type. It has 2 such representations, one of dimension 3520 and one of dimension 4752.

== Maximal subgroups ==
Finkelstein (1973) found the 12 conjugacy classes of maximal subgroups of McL as follows:

Maximal subgroups of McL
No.	Structure	Order	Index	Comments
1	U_{4}(3)	3,265,920 = 2^{7}·3^{6}·5·7	275 = 5^{2}·11	point stabilizer of its action on the McLaughlin graph
2,3	M_{22}	443,520 = 2^{7}·3^{2}·5·7·11	2,025 = 3^{4}·5^{2}	two classes, fused by an outer automorphism
4	U_{3}(5)	126,000 = 2^{4}·3^{2}·5^{3}·7	7,128 = 2^{3}·3^{4}·11	
5	3^{1+4}:2.S_{5}	58,320 = 2^{4}·3^{6}·5	15,400 = 2^{3}·5^{2}·7·11	normalizer of a subgroup of order 3 (class 3A)
6	3^{4}:M_{10}	58,320 = 2^{4}·3^{6}·5	15,400 = 2^{3}·5^{2}·7·11	
7	L_{3}(4):2_{2}	40,320 = 2^{7}·3^{2}·5·7	22,275 = 3^{4}·5^{2}·11	
8	2.A_{8}	40,320 = 2^{7}·3^{2}·5·7	22,275 = 3^{4}·5^{2}·11	centralizer of involution
9,10	2^{4}:A_{7}	40,320 = 2^{7}·3^{2}·5·7	22,275 = 3^{4}·5^{2}·11	two classes, fused by an outer automorphism
11	M_{11}	7,920 = 2^{4}·3^{2}·5·11	113,400 = 2^{3}·3^{4}·5^{2}·7	the subgroup fixed by an outer involution
12	5^{1+2}_{+}:3:8	3,000 = 2^{3}·3·5^{3}	299,376 = 2^{4}·3^{5}·7·11	normalizer of a subgroup of order 5 (class 5A)

== Conjugacy classes ==
Traces of matrices in a standard 24-dimensional representation of McL are shown. The names of conjugacy classes are taken from the Atlas of Finite Group Representations.

Cycle structures in the rank 3 permutation representation, degree 275, of McL are shown.

Class	Centralizer order	No. elements	Trace	Cycle type	
1A	898,128,000	1	24		
2A	40,320	22275 = 3^{4} ⋅ 5^{2} ⋅ 11	8	1^{35}, 2^{120}	
3A	29,160	30800 = 2^{4} ⋅ 5^{2} ⋅ 7 ⋅ 11	-3	1^{5}, 3^{90}	
3B	972	924000 = 2^{5} ⋅ 3 ⋅ 5^{3} ⋅ 7 ⋅ 11	6	1^{14}, 3^{87}	
4A	96	9355500 = 2^{2} ⋅ 3^{5} ⋅ 5^{3} ⋅ 7 ⋅ 11	4	1^{7}, 2^{14}, 4^{60}	
5A	750	1197504 = 2^{6} ⋅ 3^{5} ⋅ 7 ⋅ 11	-1	5^{55}	
5B	25	35925120 = 2^{7} ⋅ 3^{6} ⋅ 5 ⋅ 7 ⋅ 11	4	1^{5}, 5^{54}	
6A	360	2494800 = 2^{4} ⋅ 3^{4} ⋅ 5^{2} ⋅ 7 ⋅ 11	5	1^{5}, 3^{10}, 6^{40}	
6B	36	24948000 = 2^{5} ⋅ 3^{4} ⋅ 5^{3} ⋅ 7 ⋅ 11	2	1^{2}, 2^{6}, 3^{11}, 6^{38}	
7A	14	64152000 = 2^{6} ⋅ 3^{6} ⋅ 5^{3} ⋅ 11	3	1^{2}, 7^{39}	power equivalent
7B	14	64152000 = 2^{6} ⋅ 3^{6} ⋅ 5^{3} ⋅ 11	3	1^{2}, 7^{39}	power equivalent
8A	8	112266000 = 2^{4} ⋅ 3^{6} ⋅ 5^{3} ⋅ 7 ⋅ 11	2	1, 2^{3}, 4^{7}, 8^{30}	
9A	27	33264000 = 2^{7} ⋅ 3^{3} ⋅ 5^{3} ⋅ 7 ⋅ 11	3	1^{2}, 3, 9^{30}	power equivalent
9B	27	33264000 = 2^{7} ⋅ 3^{3} ⋅ 5^{3} ⋅ 7 ⋅ 11	3	1^{2}, 3, 9^{30}	power equivalent
10A	30	29937600 = 2^{6} ⋅ 3^{5} ⋅ 5^{2} ⋅ 7 ⋅ 11	3	5^{7}, 10^{24}	
11A	11	81648000 = 2^{7} ⋅ 3^{6} ⋅ 5^{3} ⋅ 7	2	11^{25}	power equivalent
11B	11	81648000 = 2^{7} ⋅ 3^{6} ⋅ 5^{3} ⋅ 7	2	11^{25}	power equivalent
12A	12	74844000 = 2^{5} ⋅ 3^{5} ⋅ 5^{3} ⋅ 7 ⋅ 11	1	1, 2^{2}, 3^{2}, 6^{4}, 12^{20}	
14A	14	64152000 = 2^{6} ⋅ 3^{6} ⋅ 5^{3} ⋅ 11	1	2, 7^{5}, 14^{17}	power equivalent
14B	14	64152000 = 2^{6} ⋅ 3^{6} ⋅ 5^{3} ⋅ 11	1	2, 7^{5}, 14^{17}	power equivalent
15A	30	29937600 = 2^{6} ⋅ 3^{5} ⋅ 5^{2} ⋅ 7 ⋅ 11	2	5, 15^{18}	power equivalent
15B	30	29937600 = 2^{6} ⋅ 3^{5} ⋅ 5^{2} ⋅ 7 ⋅ 11	2	5, 15^{18}	power equivalent
30A	30	29937600 = 2^{6} ⋅ 3^{5} ⋅ 5^{2} ⋅ 7 ⋅ 11	0	5, 15^{2}, 30^{8}	power equivalent
30B	30	29937600 = 2^{6} ⋅ 3^{5} ⋅ 5^{2} ⋅ 7 ⋅ 11	0	5, 15^{2}, 30^{8}	power equivalent

== Generalized Monstrous Moonshine ==
Conway and Norton suggested in their 1979 paper that monstrous moonshine is not limited to the monster. Larissa Queen and others subsequently found that one can construct the expansions of many Hauptmoduln from simple combinations of dimensions of sporadic groups. For the Conway groups, the relevant McKay–Thompson series is $T_{2A}(\tau)$ and $T_{4A}(\tau)$.
