= Hexacode =

In coding theory, the hexacode is a length 6 linear code of dimension 3 over the Galois field $GF(4)=\{0,1,\omega,\omega^2\}$ of 4 elements defined by

$$H=\{(a,b,c,f(1),f(\omega),f(\omega^2)) : f(x):=ax^2+bx+c; a,b,c\in GF(4)\}.$$

It is a 3-dimensional subspace of the vector space of dimension 6 over $GF(4)$. Then $H$ contains 45 codewords of weight 4, 18 codewords of weight 6 and the zero word. The full automorphism group of the hexacode is $3.A_6$. The hexacode can be used to describe the Miracle Octad Generator of R. T. Curtis.
