= Janet Sawicki =

American cancer researcher

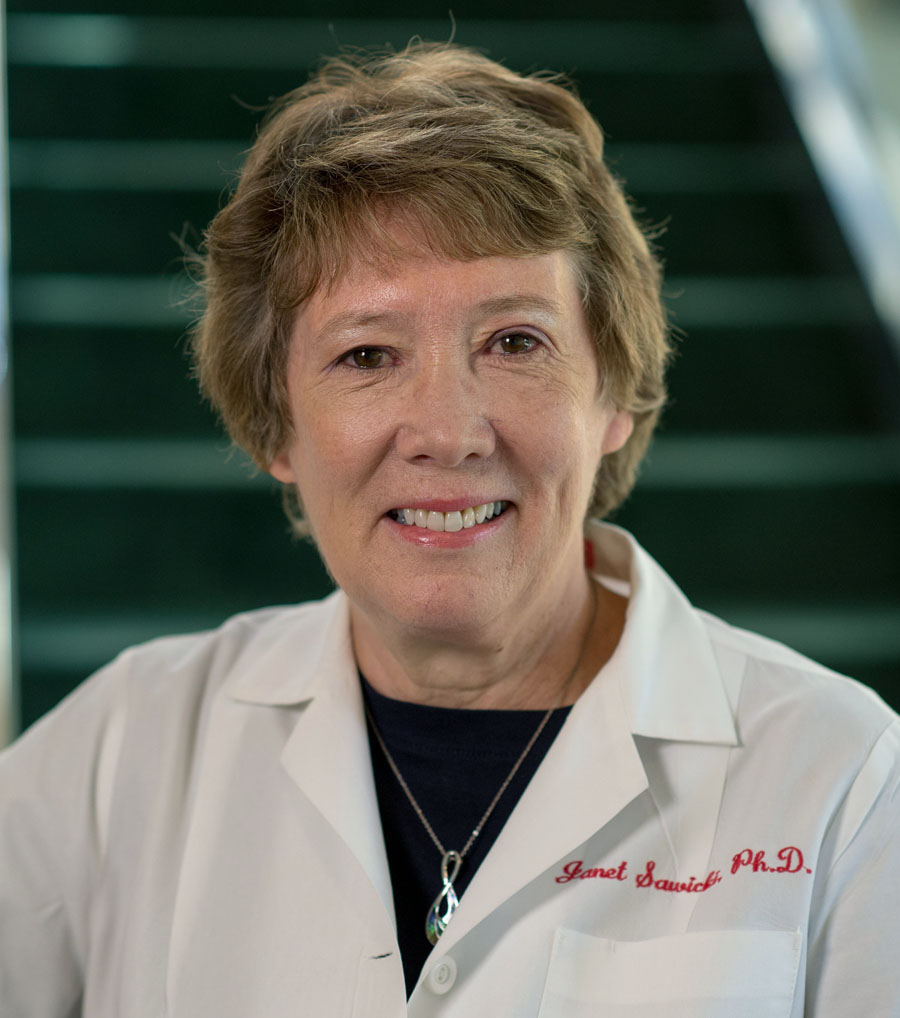
- Education: Cornell University (PhD); University of Delaware (BA)
- Scientific career
- Fields: Cancer research
- Workplaces: Lankenau Institute for Medical Research

Janet Sawicki is an American cancer researcher, and professor emeritus and former deputy director of the Lankenau Institute for Medical Research. Her research is focused on the preclinical development of treatments for cancers using DNA and siRNA.

Sawicki earned her B.A. in biology from the University of Delaware in 1971, her PhD in genetics from Cornell University in 1976, worked as a postdoc at Yale University, and then with Charles Epstein at University of California, San Francisco. In 1981, Sawicki moved back to the Wistar Institute in Philadelphia, first as a research associate and then as assistant professor. She also served as assistant professor of human genetics in the associated faculty of the University of Pennsylvania’s school of medicine. In 1990, Sawicki moved her lab to LIMR, where she and her team are developing new therapeutic strategies for improving the treatment of metastatic cancer.
