= Binary Golay code =

Type of linear error-correcting code

Extended binary Golay code
- Generator matrix
- Named after: Marcel J. E. Golay

Classification
- Type: Linear block code
- Block length: 24
- Message length: 12
- Rate: 12/24 = 0.5
- Distance: 8
- Alphabet size: 2
- Notation: $[24,12,8]_2$-code

Perfect binary Golay code
- Named after: Marcel J. E. Golay

Classification
- Type: Linear block code
- Block length: 23
- Message length: 12
- Rate: 12/23 ~ 0.522
- Distance: 7
- Alphabet size: 2
- Notation: $[23,12,7]_2$-code

In mathematics and electronics engineering, a binary Golay code is a type of linear error-correcting code used in digital communications. The binary Golay code, along with the ternary Golay code, has deep connection to the theory of finite sporadic groups in mathematics. These codes are named in honor of Marcel J. E. Golay whose 1949 paper introducing them has been called, by E. R. Berlekamp, the "best single published page" in coding theory.

There are two closely related binary Golay codes. The extended binary Golay code, G_{24} (sometimes just called the "Golay code" in finite group theory) encodes 12 bits of data in a 24-bit word in such a way that any 3-bit errors can be corrected or any 7-bit errors can be detected. The other, the perfect binary Golay code, G_{23}, has codewords of length 23 and is obtained from the extended binary Golay code by deleting one coordinate position (conversely, the extended binary Golay code is obtained from the perfect binary Golay code by adding a parity bit). In standard coding notation, the codes have parameters [24, 12, 8] and [23, 12, 7], corresponding to the length of the codewords, the dimension of the code, and the minimum Hamming distance between two codewords, respectively.

== Mathematical definition ==
In mathematical terms, the extended binary Golay code G_{24} consists of a 12-dimensional linear subspace W of the space V = F^{24}_{2} of 24-bit words such that any two distinct elements of W differ in at least 8 coordinates. W is called a linear code because it is a vector space. In all, W comprises 4096 = 2^{12} elements.

- The elements of W are called code words. They can also be described as subsets of a set of 24 elements, where addition is defined as taking the symmetric difference of the subsets.
- In the extended binary Golay code, all code words have Hamming weights of 0, 8, 12, 16, or 24. Code words of weight 8 are called octads and code words of weight 12 are called dodecads.
- Octads of the code G_{24} are elements of the S(5,8,24) Steiner system. There are 759 = 3 × 11 × 23 octads and 759 complements thereof. It follows that there are 2576 = 2^{4} × 7 × 23 dodecads.
- Two octads intersect (have 1's in common) in 0, 2, or 4 coordinates in the binary vector representation (these are the possible intersection sizes in the subset representation). An octad and a dodecad intersect at 2, 4, or 6 coordinates.
- Up to relabeling coordinates, W is unique.

The binary Golay code, G_{23} is a perfect code. That is, the spheres of radius three around code words form a partition of the vector space. G_{23} is a 12-dimensional subspace of the space F^{23}_{2}.

The automorphism group of the perfect binary Golay code G_{23} (meaning the subgroup of the group S_{23} of permutations of the coordinates of F^{23}_{2} which leave G_{23} invariant), is the Mathieu group $M_{23}$. The automorphism group of the extended binary Golay code is the Mathieu group $M_{24}$, of order 2^{10} × 3^{3} × 5 × 7 × 11 × 23. $M_{24}$ is transitive on octads and on dodecads. The other Mathieu groups occur as stabilizers of one or several elements of W.

There is a single word of weight 24, which is a 1-dimensional invariant subspace. $M_{24}$ therefore has an 11-dimensional irreducible representation on the field with 2 elements. In addition, since the binary golay code is a 12-dimensional subspace of a 24-dimensional space, $M_{24}$ also acts on the 12-dimensional quotient space, called the binary Golay cocode. A word in the cocode is in the same coset as a word of length 0, 1, 2, 3, or 4. In the last case, 6 (disjoint) cocode words all lie in the same coset. There is an 11-dimensional invariant subspace, consisting of cocode words with odd weight, which gives $M_{24}$ a second 11-dimensional representation on the field with 2 elements.

== Constructions ==
- Lexicographic code: Order the vectors in V lexicographically (i.e., interpret them as unsigned 24-bit binary integers and take the usual ordering). Starting with w_{0} = 0, define w_{1}, w_{2}, ..., w_{12} by the rule that w_{n} is the smallest integer which differs from all linear combinations of previous elements in at least eight coordinates. Then W can be defined as the span of w_{1}, ..., w_{12}.
- Mathieu group: Witt in 1938 published a construction of the largest Mathieu group that can be used to construct the extended binary Golay code.
- Quadratic residue code: Consider the set N of quadratic non-residues (mod 23). This is an 11-element subset of the cyclic group Z/23Z. Consider the translates t+N of this subset. Augment each translate to a 12-element set S_{t} by adding an element ∞. Then labeling the basis elements of V by 0, 1, 2, ..., 22, ∞, W can be defined as the span of the words S_{t} together with the word consisting of all basis vectors. (The perfect code is obtained by leaving out ∞.)
- As a cyclic code: The perfect G_{23} code can be constructed via the factorization of $x^{23}+1$ over the binary field GF(2):
  $$x^{23} + 1 = (x+1)(x^{11} + x^9+x^7+x^6+x^5+x+1)(x^{11}+x^{10}+x^6+x^5+x^4+x^2+1).$$
  It is the code generated by $\left(x^{11}+x^{10}+x^6+x^5+x^4+x^2+1\right)$. Either of degree 11 irreducible factors can be used to generate the code.
- Turyn's construction of 1967, "A Simple Construction of the Binary Golay Code," that starts from the Hamming code of length 8 and does not use the quadratic residues mod 23.
- From the Steiner System S(5,8,24), consisting of 759 subsets of a 24-set. If one interprets the support of each subset as a 0-1-codeword of length 24 (with Hamming-weight 8), these are the "octads" in the binary Golay code. The entire Golay code can be obtained by repeatedly taking the symmetric differences of subsets, i.e. binary addition. An easier way to write down the Steiner system resp. the octads is the Miracle Octad Generator of R. T. Curtis, that uses a particular 1:1-correspondence between the 35 partitions of an 8-set into two 4-sets and the 35 partitions of the finite vector space $\mathbb{F}_2^4$ into 4 planes. Nowadays often the compact approach of Conway's hexacode, that uses a 4×6 array of square cells, is used.
- Winning positions in the mathematical game of Mogul: a position in Mogul is a row of 24 coins. Each turn consists of flipping from one to seven coins such that the leftmost of the flipped coins goes from head to tail. The losing positions are those with no legal move. If heads are interpreted as 1 and tails as 0 then moving to a codeword from the extended binary Golay code guarantees it will be possible to force a win.
- A generator matrix for the binary Golay code is I A, where I is the 12×12 identity matrix, and A is the complement of the adjacency matrix of the icosahedron.

=== A convenient representation ===
It is convenient to use the "Miracle Octad Generator" format, with coordinates in an array of 4 rows, 6 columns. Addition is taking the symmetric difference. All 6 columns have the same parity, which equals that of the top row.

A partition of the 6 columns into 3 pairs of adjacent ones constitutes a trio. This is a partition into 3 octad sets. A subgroup, the projective special linear group PSL(2,7) x S_{3} of a trio subgroup of M_{24} is useful for generating a basis. PSL(2,7) permutes the octads internally, in parallel. S_{3} permutes the 3 octads bodily.

The basis begins with octad T:

0 1 1 1 1 1
1 0 0 0 0 0
1 0 0 0 0 0
1 0 0 0 0 0

and 5 similar octads. The sum N of all 6 of these code words consists of all 1's. Adding N to a code word produces its complement.

Griess (p. 59) uses the labeling:

∞ 0 | ∞ 0 | ∞ 0
3 2 | 3 2 | 3 2
5 1 | 5 1 | 5 1
6 4 | 6 4 | 6 4

PSL(2,7) is naturally the linear fractional group generated by (0123456) and (0∞)(16)(23)(45). The 7-cycle acts on T to give a subspace including also the basis elements

0 1 1 0 1 0 
0 0 0 0 0 0
0 1 0 1 0 1
1 1 0 0 0 0

and

0 1 1 0 1 0
0 1 0 1 0 1
1 1 0 0 0 0
0 0 0 0 0 0

The resulting 7-dimensional subspace has a 3-dimensional quotient space upon ignoring the latter 2 octads.

There are 4 other code words of similar structure that complete the basis of 12 code words for this representation of W.

W has a subspace of dimension 4, symmetric under PSL(2,7) x S_{3}, spanned by N and 3 dodecads formed of subsets {0,3,5,6}, {0,1,4,6}, and {0,1,2,5}.

== Practical applications of Golay codes ==
=== NASA deep space missions ===
Error correction was vital to data transmission in the Voyager 1 and 2 spacecraft particularly because memory constraints dictated offloading data virtually instantly leaving no second chances. Hundreds of color pictures of Jupiter and Saturn in their 1979, 1980, and 1981 fly-bys would be transmitted within a constrained telecommunications bandwidth. Color image transmission required three times as much data as black and white images, so the 7-error correcting Reed–Muller code that had been used to transmit the black and white Mariner images was replaced with the much higher data rate Golay (24,12,8) code.

=== Radio communications ===
The MIL-STD-188 American military standards for automatic link establishment in high frequency radio systems specify the use of an extended (24,12) Golay code for forward error correction.

In two-way radio communication digital-coded squelch (DCS, CDCSS) system uses 23-bit Golay (23,12) code word which has the ability to detect and correct errors of 3 or fewer bits.

== See also ==
- Leech lattice
- Linear code
