= Conway group Co2 =

Sporadic simple group

In the area of modern algebra known as group theory, the Conway group Co_{2} is a sporadic simple group of order

42,305,421,312,000
= 2^{18} · 3^{6} · 5^{3} · 7 · 11 · 23
≈ 4×10^{13}.

== History and properties ==
Co_{2} is one of the 26 sporadic groups and was discovered by (Conway 1968, 1969) as the group of automorphisms of the Leech lattice Λ fixing a lattice vector of type 2. It is thus a subgroup of Co_{0}. It is isomorphic to a subgroup of Co_{1}. The direct product 2×Co_{2} is maximal in Co_{0}.

The Schur multiplier and the outer automorphism group are both trivial.

== Representations ==
Co_{2} acts as a rank 3 permutation group on 2300 points. These points can be identified with planar hexagons in the Leech lattice having 6 type 2 vertices.

Co_{2} acts on the 23-dimensional even integral lattice with no roots of determinant 4, given as a sublattice of the Leech lattice orthogonal to a norm 4 vector. Over the field with 2 elements it has a 22-dimensional faithful representation; this is the smallest faithful representation over any field.

Feit (1974) showed that if a finite group has an absolutely irreducible faithful rational representation of dimension 23 and has no subgroups of index 23 or 24 then it is contained in either Z/2Z × Co_{2} or Z/2Z × Co_{3}.

The Mathieu group M_{23} is isomorphic to a maximal subgroup of Co_{2} and one representation, in permutation matrices, fixes the type 2 vector u = (-3,1^{23}). A block sum ζ of the involution η =

$${\mathbf 1/2}  \left ( \begin{matrix}
1 &  -1 & -1 & -1 \\
-1 &  1 & -1 & -1 \\
-1 & -1 &  1 & -1 \\
-1 & -1 & -1 & 1 \end{matrix} \right )$$

and 5 copies of -η also fixes the same vector. Hence Co_{2} has a convenient matrix representation inside the standard representation of Co_{0}. The trace of ζ is -8, while the involutions in M_{23} have trace 8.

A 24-dimensional block sum of η and -η is in Co_{0} if and only if the number of copies of η is odd.

Another representation fixes the vector v = (4,-4,0^{22}). A monomial and maximal subgroup includes a representation of M_{22}:2, where any α interchanging the first 2 co-ordinates restores v by then negating the vector. Also included are diagonal involutions corresponding to octads (trace 8), 16-sets (trace -8), and dodecads (trace 0). It can be shown that Co_{2} has just 3 conjugacy classes of involutions. η leaves (4,-4,0,0) unchanged; the block sum ζ provides a non-monomial generator completing this representation of Co_{2}.

There is an alternate way to construct the stabilizer of v. Now u and u+v = (1,-3,1^{22}) are vertices of a 2-2-2 triangle (vide infra). Then u, u+v, v, and their negatives form a coplanar hexagon fixed by ζ and M_{22}; these generate a group Fi_{21} ≈ U_{6}(2). α (vide supra) extends this to Fi_{21}:2, which is maximal in Co_{2}. Lastly, Co_{0} is transitive on type 2 points, so that a 23-cycle fixing u has a conjugate fixing v, and the generation is completed.

== Maximal subgroups ==
Some maximal subgroups fix or reflect 2-dimensional sublattices of the Leech lattice. It is usual to define these planes by h-k-l triangles: triangles including the origin as a vertex, with edges (differences of vertices) being vectors of types h, k, and l.

Wilson (2009) found the 11 conjugacy classes of maximal subgroups of Co_{2} as follows:

Maximal subgroups of Co_{2}
No.	Structure	Order	Index	Comments
1	Fi_{21}:2 ≈ U_{6}(2):2	18,393,661,440 = 2^{16}·3^{6}·5·7·11	2,300 = 2^{2}·5^{2}·23	symmetry/reflection group of coplanar hexagon of 6 type 2 points; fixes one hexagon in a rank 3 permutation representation of Co_{2} on 2300 such hexagons. Under this subgroup the hexagons are split into orbits of 1, 891, and 1408. Fi_{21} fixes a 2-2-2 triangle defining the plane.
2	2^{10}:M_{22}:2	908,328,960 = 2^{18}·3^{2}·5·7·11	46,575 = 3^{4}·5^{2}·23	has monomial representation described above; 2^{10}:M_{22} fixes a 2-2-4 triangle.
3	McL	898,128,000 = 2^{7}·3^{6}·5^{3}·7·11	47,104 = 2^{11}·23	fixes a 2-2-3 triangle
4	2^{1+8}_{+}:Sp_{6}(2)	743,178,240 = 2^{18}·3^{4}·5·7	56,925 = 3^{2}·5^{2}·11·23	centralizer of an involution of class 2A (trace -8)
5	HS:2	88,704,000 = 2^{10}·3^{2}·5^{3}·7·11	476,928 = 2^{8}·3^{4}·23	fixes a 2-3-3 triangle or exchanges its type 3 vertices with sign change
6	(2^{4} × 2^{1+6}_{+}).A_{8}	41,287,680 = 2^{17}·3^{2}·5·7	1,024,650 = 2·3^{4}·5^{2}·11·23	centralizer of an involution of class 2B
7	U_{4}(3):D_{8}	26,127,360 = 2^{10}·3^{6}·5·7	1,619,200 = 2^{8}·5^{2}·11·23	
8	2^{4+10}.(S_{5} × S_{3})	11,796,480 = 2^{18}·3^{2}·5	3,586,275 = 3^{4}·5^{2}·7·11·23	
9	M_{23}	10,200,960 = 2^{7}·3^{2}·5·7·11·23	4,147,200 = 2^{11}·3^{4}·5^{2}	fixes a 2-3-4 triangle
10	3^{1+4}_{+}.2^{1+4}_{–}.S_{5}	933,120 = 2^{8}·3^{6}·5	45,337,600 = 2^{10}·5^{2}·7·11·23	normalizer of a subgroup of order 3 (class 3A)
11	5^{1+2}_{+}:4S_{4}	12,000 = 2^{5}·3·5^{3}	3,525,451,776 = 2^{13}·3^{5}·7·11·23	normalizer of a subgroup of order 5 (class 5A)

== Conjugacy classes ==
Traces of matrices in a standard 24-dimensional representation of Co_{2} are shown. The names of conjugacy classes are taken from the Atlas of Finite Group Representations.

Centralizers of unknown structure are indicated with brackets.

Class	Order of centralizer	Centralizer	Size of class	Trace	
1A		all Co_{2}	1	24	
2A	743,178,240	2^{1+8}:Sp_{6}(2)	3^{2}·5^{2}·11·23	-8	
2B	41,287,680	2^{1+4}:2^{4}.A_{8}	2·3^{4}·5^{2}11·23	8	
2C	1,474,560	2^{10}.A_{6}.2^{2}	2^{3}·3^{4}·5^{2}·7·11·23	0	
3A	466,560	3^{1+4}2^{1+4}A_{5}	2^{11}·5^{2}·7·11·23	-3	
3B	155,520	3×U_{4}(2).2	2^{11}·3·5^{2}·7·11·23	6	
4A	3,096,576	4.2^{6}.U_{3}(3).2	2^{4}·3^{3}·5^{3}·11·23	8	
4B	122,880	[2^{10}]S_{5}	2^{5}·3^{5}·5^{2}·7·11·23	-4	
4C	73,728	[2^{13}.3^{2}]	2^{5}·3^{4}·5^{3}·7·11·23	4	
4D	49,152	[2^{14}.3]	2^{4}·3^{5}·5^{3}·7·11·23	0	
4E	6,144	[2^{11}.3]	2^{7}·3^{5}·5^{3}·7·11·23	4	
4F	6,144	[2^{11}.3]	2^{7}·3^{5}·5^{3}·7·11·23	0	
4G	1,280	[2^{8}.5]	2^{10}·3^{6}·5^{2}·7·11·23	0	
5A	3,000	5^{1+2}2A_{4}	2^{15}·3^{5}·7·11·23	-1	
5B	600	5×S_{5}	2^{15}·3^{5}·5·7·11·23	4	
6A	5,760	3.2^{1+4}A5	2^{11}·3^{4}·5^{2}·7·11·23	5	
6B	5,184	[2^{6}.3^{4}]	2^{12}·3^{2}·5^{3}·7·11·23	1	
6C	4,320	6×S_{6}	2^{13}·3^{3}·5^{2}·7·11·23	4	
6D	3,456	[2^{7}.3^{3}]	2^{11}·3^{3}·5^{3}·7·11·23	-2	
6E	576	[2^{6}.3^{2}]	2^{12}·3^{4}·5^{3}·7·11·23	2	
6F	288	[2^{5}.3^{2}]	2^{13}·3^{4}·5^{3}·7·11·23	0	
7A	56	7×D_{8}	2^{15}·3^{6}·5^{3}·11·233	3	
8A	768	[2^{8}.3]	2^{10}·3^{5}·5^{3}·7·11·23	0	
8B	768	[2^{8}.3]	2^{10}·3^{5}·5^{3}·7·11·23	-2	
8C	512	[2^{9}]	2^{9}·3^{6}·5^{3}·7·11·23	4	
8D	512	[2^{9}]	2^{9}·3^{6}·5^{3}·7·11·23	0	
8E	256	[2^{8}]	2^{10}·3^{6}·5^{3}·7·11·23	2	
8F	64	[2^{6}]	2^{12}·3^{6}·5^{3}·7·11·23	2	
9A	54	9×S_{3}	2^{17}·3^{3}·5^{3}·7·11·23	3	
10A	120	5×2.A_{4}	2^{15}·3^{5}·5^{2}·7·11·23	3	
10B	60	10×S_{3}	2^{16}·3^{5}·5^{2}·7·11·23	2	
10C	40	5×D_{8}	2^{15}·3^{6}·5^{2}·7·11·23	0	
11A	11	11	2^{18}·3^{6}·5^{3}·7·23	2	
12A	864	[2^{5}.3^{3}]	2^{13}·3^{3}·5^{3}·7·11·23	-1	
12B	288	[2^{5}.3^{2}]	2^{13}·3^{4}·5^{3}·7·11·23	1	
12C	288	[2^{5}.3^{2}]	2^{13}·3^{4}·5^{3}·7·11·23	2	
12D	288	[2^{5}.3^{2}]	2^{13}·3^{4}·5^{3}·7·11·23	-2	
12E	96	[2^{5}.3]	2^{13}·3^{5}·5^{3}·7·11·23	3	
12F	96	[2^{5}.3]	2^{13}·3^{5}·5^{3}·7·11·23	2	
12G	48	[2^{4}.3]	2^{14}·3^{5}·5^{3}·7·11·23	1	
12H	48	[2^{4}.3]	2^{14}·3^{5}·5^{3}·7·11·23	0	
14A	56	5×D_{8}	2^{15}·3^{6}·5^{3}·11·23	-1	
14B	28	14×2	2^{16}·3^{6}·5^{3}·11·23	1	power equivalent
14C	28	14×2	2^{16}·3^{6}·5^{3}·11·23	1	power equivalent
15A	30	30	2^{17}·3^{5}·5^{2}·7·11·23	1	
15B	30	30	2^{17}·3^{5}·5^{2}·7·11·23	2	power equivalent
15C	30	30	2^{17}·3^{5}·5^{2}·7·11·23	2	power equivalent
16A	32	16×2	2^{13}·3^{6}·5^{3}·7·11·23	2	
16B	32	16×2	2^{13}·3^{6}·5^{3}·7·11·23	0	
18A	18	18	2^{17}·3^{4}·5^{3}·7·11·23	1	
20A	20	20	2^{16}·3^{6}·5^{2}·7·11·23	1	
20B	20	20	2^{16}·3^{6}·5^{2}·7·11·23	0	
23A	23	23	2^{18}·3^{6}·5^{3}·7·11	1	power equivalent
23B	23	23	2^{18}·3^{6}·5^{3}·7·11	1	power equivalent
24A	24	24	2^{15}·3^{5}·5^{3}·7·11·23	0	
24B	24	24	2^{15}·3^{5}·5^{3}·7·11·23	1	
28A	28	28	2^{16}·3^{6}·5^{3}·11·23	1	
30A	30	30	2^{17}·3^{5}·5^{2}·7·11·23	-1	
30B	30	30	2^{17}·3^{5}·5^{2}·7·11·23	0	
30C	30	30	2^{17}·3^{5}·5^{2}·7·11·23	0	
