= Conway triangle notation =

Notation for trigonometric relationships

In geometry, the Conway triangle notation simplifies and clarifies the algebraic expression of various trigonometric relationships in a triangle. Using the symbol S for twice the triangle's area, the symbol S_{φ} is defined to mean S times the cotangent of any arbitrary angle φ.

The notation is named after English mathematician John Horton Conway, who promoted its use, but essentially the same notation (using p instead of S) can be found in an 1894 paper by Spanish mathematician Juan Jacobo Durán Loriga.

== Definition ==
Given a reference triangle whose sides are a, b and c and whose corresponding internal angles are A, B, and C then the Conway triangle notation is simply represented as follows:
$$S = bc \sin A = ac \sin B = ab \sin C ,$$
where
$$\begin{align}
S &= 2 \times \text{reference triangle area}, \\[2pt]
S_\varphi &= S \cot \varphi.
\end{align}$$

== Basic formulas ==
In particular:
$$\begin{align}
S_A &= S \cot A = bc \cos A= \frac {b^2+c^2-a^2} {2}, \\[2pt]
S_B &= S \cot B = ac \cos B= \frac {a^2+c^2-b^2} {2}, \\[2pt]
S_C &= S \cot C = ab \cos C= \frac {a^2+b^2-c^2} {2}, \\[2pt]
S_\omega &= S \cot \omega = \frac {a^2+b^2+c^2} {2},
\end{align}$$

where ω is the Brocard angle. The law of cosines is used: $a^2=b^2+c^2-2bc \cos A.$

Third-, double-, and half-angle identities:
$$\begin{align}
S_{\frac {\pi} {3}} &= S \cot {\frac {\pi} {3}} = S \frac {\sqrt 3}{3} \\[2pt]
S_{2\varphi} &= \frac {S_\varphi^2 - S^2} {2S_\varphi} \\[2pt]
S_{ \frac {\varphi} {2}} &= S_\varphi + \sqrt {S_\varphi^2 + S^2}
\end{align}$$

for values of φ where 0 < φ < π,

$$\begin{align}
S_{\vartheta + \varphi} &= \frac {S_\vartheta S_\varphi - S^2} {S_\vartheta + S_\varphi}, \\[2pt]
S_{\vartheta - \varphi} &= \frac {S_\vartheta S_\varphi + S^2} {S_\varphi - S_\vartheta}.
\end{align}$$

Furthermore the convention uses a shorthand notation for $S_{\vartheta}S_{\varphi}=S_{\vartheta\varphi} ,$ and $S_{\vartheta}S_{\varphi}S_{\psi}=S_{\vartheta\varphi\psi} .$

== Trigonometric relationships ==
$$\begin{align}
\sin A &= \frac {S} {bc} = \frac {S} {\sqrt {S_A^2 + S^2}} \\[2pt]
\cos A &= \frac {S_A} {bc} = \frac {S_A} {\sqrt {S_A^2 + S^2}} \\[2pt]
\tan A &= \frac {S} {S_A} \\[6pt]
a^2 &= S_B + S_C \\[2pt]
b^2 &= S_A + S_C \\[2pt]
c^2 &= S_A + S_B
\end{align}$$

== Important identities ==
$$\begin{align}
\sum_\text{cyclic} S_A &= S_A+S_B+S_C = S_\omega \\[2pt]
S^2 &= b^2c^2 - S_A^2 = a^2c^2 - S_B^2 = a^2b^2 - S_C^2 \\[6pt]
S_{BC} &= S_BS_C = S^2 - a^2S_A \\[2pt]
S_{AC} &= S_AS_C = S^2 - b^2S_B \\[2pt]
S_{AB} &= S_AS_B = S^2 - c^2S_C \\[8pt]
S_{ABC} &= S_AS_BS_C = S^2(S_\omega-4R^2) \\[8pt]
S_\omega &= s^2-r^2-4rR
\end{align}$$

where

R is the circumradius
r is the incenter
$$abc = 2SR$$
$$s = \frac{a+b+c}{2}$$
$$\frac{S}{r} = a+b+c$$

== Trigonometric conversions ==
$$\begin{align}
\sin A \sin B \sin C &= \frac {S} {4R^2} \\[2pt]
\cos A \cos B \cos C &= \frac {S_\omega-4R^2} {4R^2}
\end{align}$$

$$\begin{align}
\sum_\text{cyclic} \sin A &= \frac {S} {2Rr} = \frac {s}{R} \\[2pt]
\sum_\text{cyclic} \cos A &= \frac {r+R} {R} \\[2pt]
\sum_\text{cyclic} \tan A &= \frac {S}{S_\omega-4R^2}=\tan A \tan B \tan C
\end{align}$$

== Useful formulas ==
$$\begin{array}{ll}
\displaystyle \sum_\text{cyclic} a^2S_A \!\! &=& a^2S_A + b^2S_B + c^2 S_C = 2S^2 \\[2pt]
\displaystyle \sum_\text{cyclic} a^4 &=& 2(S_\omega^2-S^2)  \\[2pt]
\displaystyle \sum_\text{cyclic} S_A^2 &=& S_\omega^2 - 2S^2 \\[2pt]
\displaystyle \sum_\text{cyclic} S_{BC} &=& \displaystyle \sum_\text{cyclic} S_BS_C = S^2 \\[2pt]
\displaystyle \sum_\text{cyclic} b^2c^2 &=&  S_\omega^2 + S^2
\end{array}$$

== Applications ==
Let D be the distance between two points P and Q whose trilinear coordinates are
$$\begin{align}
P = p_a : p_b : p_c, \\
Q = q_a : q_b : q_c.
\end{align}$$
Let
$$\begin{align}
K_p &= ap_a + bp_b + cp_c, \\
K_q &= aq_a + bq_b + cq_c.
\end{align}$$
Then D is given by the formula:
$$D^2 = \sum_\text{cyclic} a^2S_A\left(\frac {p_a}{K_p} - \frac {q_a}{K_q}\right)^2$$

=== Distance between circumcenter and orthocenter ===
Using this formula it is possible to determine |OH|, the distance between the circumcenter and the orthocenter as follows:

For the circumcenter $p_a = a S_A,$

and for the orthocenter $q_a = \frac{S_B S_C}{a},$

$$\begin{align}
K_p &= \sum_\text{cyclic} a^2S_A = 2S^2, \\[2pt]
K_q &= \sum_\text{cyclic} S_BS_C = S^2.
\end{align}$$

Hence:

$$\begin{align}
D^2 &= \sum_\text{cyclic} a^2S_A\left(\frac {aS_A} {2S^2} - \frac {S_BS_C} {aS^2}\right)^2 \\[2pt]
&= \frac {1} {4S^4} \sum_\text{cyclic} a^4S_A^3 - \frac {S_AS_BS_C} {S^4} \sum_\text{cyclic} a^2S_A + \frac {S_AS_BS_C} {S^4} \sum_\text{cyclic} S_BS_C \\[2pt]
&= \frac {1} {4S^4} \sum_\text{cyclic} a^2S_A^2(S^2-S_BS_C) - 2(S_\omega-4R^2) + (S_\omega-4R^2) \\[2pt]
&= \frac {1} {4S^2} \sum_\text{cyclic} a^2S_A^2 - \frac {S_AS_BS_C} {S^4} \sum_\text{cyclic} a^2S_A - (S_\omega-4R^2) \\[2pt]
&= \frac {1} {4S^2} \sum_\text{cyclic} a^2(b^2c^2-S^2) - \frac {1} {2}(S_\omega-4R^2) -(S_\omega-4R^2) \\[2pt]
&= \frac {3a^2b^2c^2} {4S^2} - \frac {1} {4} \sum_\text{cyclic} a^2 - \frac {3} {2}(S_\omega-4R^2) \\[2pt]
&= 3R^2- \frac {1} {2} S_\omega - \frac {3} {2} S_\omega + 6R^2 \\[10pt]
&= 9R^2- 2S_\omega.
\end{align}$$

Thus,

$$|OH| = \sqrt{9R^2- 2S_\omega}.$$

== See also ==
- Brocard angle
- Orthocenter
- Circumcenter
- Trilinear coordinates
