= Mathieu group M23 =

Sporadic simple group

In the area of modern algebra known as group theory, the Mathieu group M_{23} is a sporadic simple group of order

10,200,960 = 2^{7} · 3^{2} · 5 · 7 · 11 · 23
≈ 1 × 10^{7}.

== History and properties ==
M_{23} is one of the 26 sporadic groups and was introduced by Mathieu (1861, 1873). It is a 4-fold transitive permutation group on 23 objects. The Schur multiplier and the outer automorphism group are both trivial.

Milgram (2000) calculated the integral cohomology, and showed in particular that M_{23} has the unusual property that the first 4 integral homology groups all vanish.

In 2026, Xiaoyu Huang, Blake Jackson, Kyu-Hwan Lee, Bjorn Poonen, Rachel Pries, and Shaowu Zhang proved that M_{23} occurs as a Galois group over the rational numbers, completing the realization of all 26 sporadic simple groups. They constructed a regular Galois extension of Q(t) with Galois group M_{23} and an explicit degree-23 polynomial with rational coefficients whose splitting field has Galois group M_{23} over Q:

f(x) = x^{23} – 184x^{21} – 1150x^{20} + 26151x^{19} + 18400x^{18} – 1808490x^{17} + 1545462x^{16} + 67672923x^{15} – 42732528x^{14} – 1333395744x^{13} + 290615166x^{12} + 10550424369x^{11} + 3700476348x^{10} + 35123826654x^{9} – 194398310718x^{8} – 1023887308293x^{7} + 3961650395556x^{6} + 1949980486716x^{5} – 28142323927002x^{4} + 53599151839311x^{3} – 46185312415788x^{2} + 19169943578802x – 3150159884154

=== Construction using finite fields ===
Let F_{2^{11}} be the finite field with 2^{11} elements. Its group of units has order 2^{11} − 1 = 2047 = 23 · 89, so it has a cyclic subgroup C of order 23.

The Mathieu group M_{23} can be identified with the group of F_{2}-linear automorphisms of F_{2^{11}} that stabilize C. More precisely, the action of this automorphism group on C can be identified with the 4-fold transitive action of M_{23} on 23 objects.

== Representations ==
M_{23} is the point stabilizer of the action of the Mathieu group M24 on 24 points, giving it a 4-transitive permutation representation on 23 points with point stabilizer the Mathieu group M22.

M_{23} has 2 different rank 3 actions on 253 points. One is the action on unordered pairs with orbit sizes 1+42+210 and point stabilizer M_{21}.2, and the other is the action on heptads with orbit sizes 1+112+140 and point stabilizer 2^{4}.A_{7}.

The integral representation corresponding to the permutation action on 23 points decomposes into the trivial representation and a 22-dimensional representation. The 22-dimensional representation is irreducible over any field of characteristic not 2 or 23.

Over the field of order 2, it has two 11-dimensional representations, the restrictions of the corresponding representations of the Mathieu group M24.

== Maximal subgroups ==
There are 7 conjugacy classes of maximal subgroups of M_{23} as follows:

Maximal subgroups of M_{23}
No.	Structure	Order	Index	Comments
1	M_{22}	443,520 = 2^{7}·3^{2}·5·7·11	23	point stabilizer
2	L_{3}(4):2	40,320 = 2^{7}·3^{2}·5·7	253 = 11·23	has orbits of sizes 21 and 2
3	2^{4}:A_{7}	40,320 = 2^{7}·3^{2}·5·7	253 = 11·23	has orbits of sizes 7 and 16; stabilizer of W_{23} block
4	A_{8}	20,160 = 2^{6}·3^{2}·5·7	506 = 2·11·23	has orbits of sizes 8 and 15
5	M_{11}	7,920 = 2^{4}·3^{2}·5·11	1,288 = 2^{3}·7·23	has orbits of sizes 11 and 12
6	(2^{4}:A_{5}):S_{3} ≅ M_{20}:S_{3}	5,760 = 2^{7}·3^{2}·5	1,771 = 7·11·23	has orbits of sizes 3 and 20 (5 blocks of 4); one-point stabilizer of the sextet group
7	23:11	253 = 11·23	40,320 = 2^{7}·3^{2}·5·7	simply transitive

== Conjugacy classes ==
Order	No. elements	Cycle structure	
1 = 1	1	1^{23}	
2 = 2	3795 = 3 · 5 · 11 · 23	1^{7}2^{8}	
3 = 3	56672 = 2^{5} · 7 · 11 · 23	1^{5}3^{6}	
4 = 2^{2}	318780 = 2^{2} · 3^{2} · 5 · 7 · 11 · 23	1^{3}2^{2}4^{4}	
5 = 5	680064 = 2^{7} · 3 · 7 · 11 · 23	1^{3}5^{4}	
6 = 2 · 3	850080 = 2^{5} · 3 · 5 · 7 · 11 · 23	1·2^{2}3^{2}6^{2}	
7 = 7	728640 = 2^{6} · 3^{2} · 5 · 11 · 23	1^{2}7^{3}	power equivalent
7 = 7	728640 = 2^{6} · 3^{2} · 5 · 11 · 23	1^{2}7^{3}	power equivalent
8 = 2^{3}	1275120 = 2^{4} · 3^{2} · 5 · 7 · 11 · 23	1·2·4·8^{2}	
11 = 11	927360= 2^{7} · 3^{2} · 5 · 7 · 23	1·11^{2}	power equivalent
11 = 11	927360= 2^{7} · 3^{2} · 5 · 7 · 23	1·11^{2}	power equivalent
14 = 2 · 7	728640= 2^{6} · 3^{2} · 5 · 11 · 23	2·7·14	power equivalent
14 = 2 · 7	728640= 2^{6} · 3^{2} · 5 · 11 · 23	2·7·14	power equivalent
15 = 3 · 5	680064= 2^{7} · 3 · 7 · 11 · 23	3·5·15	power equivalent
15 = 3 · 5	680064= 2^{7} · 3 · 7 · 11 · 23	3·5·15	power equivalent
23 = 23	443520= 2^{7} · 3^{2} · 5 · 7 · 11	23	power equivalent
23 = 23	443520= 2^{7} · 3^{2} · 5 · 7 · 11	23	power equivalent
