= Mathieu group M12 =

Sporadic simple group

In the area of modern algebra known as group theory, the Mathieu group M_{12} is a sporadic simple group of order

95,040 = 12 · 11 · 10 · 9 · 8 = 2^{6} · 3^{3} · 5 · 11.

== History and properties ==
M_{12} is one of the 26 sporadic groups and was introduced by Mathieu (1861, 1873). It is a sharply 5-transitive permutation group on 12 objects. Burgoyne & Fong (1968) showed that the Schur multiplier of M_{12} has order 2 (correcting a mistake in (Burgoyne & Fong 1966) where they incorrectly claimed it has order 1).

The double cover had been implicitly found earlier by Coxeter (1958), who showed that M_{12} is a subgroup of the projective linear group of dimension 6 over the finite field with 3 elements.

The outer automorphism group has order 2, and the full automorphism group M_{12}.2 is contained in M_{24} as the stabilizer of a pair of complementary dodecads of 24 points, with outer automorphisms of M_{12} swapping the two dodecads.

== Representations ==
Frobenius (1904) calculated the complex character table of M_{12}.

M_{12} has a strictly 5-transitive permutation representation on 12 points, whose point stabilizer is the Mathieu group M_{11}. Identifying the 12 points with the projective line over the field of 11 elements, M_{12} is generated by the permutations of PSL_{2}(11) together with the permutation (2,10)(3,4)(5,9)(6,7). This permutation representation preserves a Steiner system S(5,6,12) of 132 special hexads, such that each pentad is contained in exactly 1 special hexad, and the hexads are the supports of the weight 6 codewords of the extended ternary Golay code. In fact M_{12} has two inequivalent actions on 12 points, exchanged by an outer automorphism; these are analogous to the two inequivalent actions of the symmetric group S_{6} on 6 points.

The double cover 2.M_{12} is the automorphism group of the extended ternary Golay code, a dimension 6 length 12 code over the field of order 3 of minimum weight 6. In particular the double cover has an irreducible 6-dimensional representation over the field of 3 elements.

The double cover 2.M_{12} is the automorphism group of any 12×12 Hadamard matrix.

M_{12} centralizes an element of order 11 in the monster group, as a result of which it acts naturally on a vertex algebra over the field with 11 elements, given as the Tate cohomology of the monster vertex algebra.

== Maximal subgroups ==
There are 11 conjugacy classes of maximal subgroups of M_{12}, 6 occurring in automorphic pairs, as follows:

Maximal subgroups of M_{12}
| No. | Structure | Order | Index | Comments |
|---|---|---|---|---|
| 1,2 | M_{11} | 7,920 = 2^{4}·3^{2}·5·11 | 12 = 2^{2}·3 | two classes, exchanged by an outer automorphism. One is the subgroup fixing a point with orbits of sizes 1 and 11, while the other acts transitively on the 12 points. |
| 3,4 | S_{6}:2 ≅ M_{10}:2 | 1,440 = 2^{5}·3^{2}·5 | 66 = 2·3·11 | two classes, exchanged by an outer automorphism. The outer automorphism group of the symmetric group S_{6}. One class is imprimitive and transitive, acting with 2 blocks of size 6, while the other is the subgroup fixing a pair of points and has orbits of sizes 2 and 10. |
| 5 | L_{2}(11) | 660 = 2^{2}·3·5·11 | 144 = 2^{4}·3^{2} | doubly transitive on the 12 points |
| 6,7 | 3^{2}:(2.S_{4}) | 432 = 2^{4}·3^{3} | 220 = 2^{2}·5·11 | two classes, exchanged by an outer automorphism. One acts with orbits of sizes 3 and 9, and the other is imprimitive on 4 sets of size 3; isomorphic to the affine group on the space C_{3} x C_{3}. |
| 8 | S_{5} x 2 | 240 = 2^{4}·3·5 | 396 = 2^{2}·3^{2}·11 | doubly imprimitive on 6 sets of 2 points; centralizer of a sextuple transposition |
| 9 | Q_{8}:S_{4} | 192 = 2^{6}·3 | 495 = 3^{2}·5·11 | orbits of sizes 4 and 8; centralizer of a quadruple transposition (an involution of class 2B) |
| 10 | 4^{2}:(2 x S_{3}) | 192 = 2^{6}·3 | 495 = 3^{2}·5·11 | imprimitive on 3 sets of size 4 |
| 11 | A_{4} x S_{3} | 72 = 2^{3}·3^{2} | 1,320 = 2^{3}·3·5·11 | doubly imprimitive, 4 sets of 3 points |

== Conjugacy classes ==
The cycle shape of an element and its conjugate under an outer automorphism are related in the following way: the union of the two cycle shapes is balanced, in other words invariant under changing each n-cycle to an N/n cycle for some integer N.

| Order | Number | Centralizer | Cycles | Fusion |
|---|---|---|---|---|
| 1 | 1 | 95040 | 1^{12} | |
| 2 | 396 | 240 | 2^{6} | |
| 2 | 495 | 192 | 1^{4}2^{4} | |
| 3 | 1760 | 54 | 1^{3}3^{3} | |
| 3 | 2640 | 36 | 3^{4} | |
| 4 | 2970 | 32 | 2^{2}4^{2} | Fused under an outer automorphism |
| 4 | 2970 | 32 | 1^{4}4^{2} | Fused under an outer automorphism |
| 5 | 9504 | 10 | 1^{2}5^{2} | |
| 6 | 7920 | 12 | 6^{2} | |
| 6 | 15840 | 6 | 1 2 3 6 | |
| 8 | 11880 | 8 | 1^{2}2 8 | Fused under an outer automorphism |
| 8 | 11880 | 8 | 4 8 | Fused under an outer automorphism |
| 10 | 9504 | 10 | 2 10 | |
| 11 | 8640 | 11 | 1 11 | Fused under an outer automorphism |
| 11 | 8640 | 11 | 1 11 | Fused under an outer automorphism |
