= Rank 3 permutation group =

In mathematical finite group theory, a rank 3 permutation group acts transitively on a set such that the stabilizer of a point has 3 orbits. The study of these groups was started by Higman (1964, 1971). Several of the sporadic simple groups were discovered as rank 3 permutation groups.

== Classification ==
The primitive rank 3 permutation groups are all in one of the following classes:

- Cameron (1981) classified the ones such that $T\times T\le G\le T_0 \operatorname{wr} Z/2Z$ where the socle T of T_{0} is simple, and T_{0} is a 2-transitive group of degree √n.
- Liebeck (1987) classified the ones with a regular elementary abelian normal subgroup
- Bannai (1971–72) classified the ones whose socle is a simple alternating group
- Kantor & Liebler (1982) classified the ones whose socle is a simple classical group
- Liebeck & Saxl (1986) classified the ones whose socle is a simple exceptional or sporadic group.

== Examples ==
If G is any 4-transitive group acting on a set S, then its action on pairs of elements of S is a rank 3 permutation group. In particular most of the alternating groups, symmetric groups, and Mathieu groups have 4-transitive actions, and so can be made into rank 3 permutation groups.

The projective general linear group acting on lines in a projective space of dimension at least 3 is a rank-3 permutation group.

Several 3-transposition groups are rank-3 permutation groups (in the action on transpositions).

It is common for the point-stabilizer of a rank-3 permutation group acting on one of the orbits to be a rank-3 permutation group. This gives several "chains" of rank-3 permutation groups, such as the Suzuki chain and the chain ending with the Fischer groups.

Some unusual rank-3 permutation groups (many from (Liebeck & Saxl 1986)) are listed below.

For each row in the table below, in the grid in the column marked "size", the number to the left of the equal sign is the degree of the permutation group for the permutation group mentioned in the row. In the grid, the sum to the right of the equal sign shows the lengths of the three orbits of the stabilizer of a point of the permutation group. For example, the expression 15 = 1+6+8 in the first row of the table under the heading means that the permutation group for the first row has degree 15, and the lengths of three orbits of the stabilizer of a point of the permutation group are 1, 6 and 8 respectively.

Group	Point stabilizer	size	Comments
A_{6} = L_{2}(9) = Sp_{4}(2)' = M_{10}'	S_{4}	15 = 1+6+8	Pairs of points, or sets of 3 blocks of 2, in the 6-point permutation representation; two classes
A_{9}	L_{2}(8):3	120 = 1+56+63	Projective line P_{1}(8); two classes
A_{10}	(A_{5}×A_{5}):4	126 = 1+25+100	Sets of 2 blocks of 5 in the natural 10-point permutation representation
L_{2}(8)	7:2 = Dih(7)	36 = 1+14+21	Pairs of points in P_{1}(8)
L_{3}(4)	A_{6}	56 = 1+10+45	Hyperovals in P_{2}(4); three classes
L_{4}(3)	PSp_{4}(3):2	117 = 1+36+80	Symplectic polarities of P_{3}(3); two classes
G_{2}(2)' = U_{3}(3)	PSL_{3}(2)	36 = 1+14+21	Suzuki chain
U_{3}(5)	A_{7}	50 = 1+7+42	The action on the vertices of the Hoffman-Singleton graph; three classes
U_{4}(3)	L_{3}(4)	162 = 1+56+105	Two classes
Sp_{6}(2)	G_{2}(2) = U_{3}(3):2	120 = 1+56+63	The Chevalley group of type G_{2} acting on the octonion algebra over GF(2)
Ω_{7}(3)	G_{2}(3)	1080 = 1+351+728	The Chevalley group of type G_{2} acting on the imaginary octonions of the octonion algebra over GF(3); two classes
U_{6}(2)	U_{4}(3):2_{2}	1408 = 1+567+840	The point stabilizer is the image of the linear representation resulting from "bringing down" the complex representation of Mitchell's group (a complex reflection group) modulo 2; three classes
M_{11}	M_{9}:2 = 3^{2}:SD_{16}	55 = 1+18+36	Pairs of points in the 11-point permutation representation
M_{12}	M_{10}:2 = A_{6}.2^{2} = PΓL(2,9)	66 = 1+20+45	Pairs of points, or pairs of complementary blocks of S(5,6,12), in the 12-point permutation representation; two classes
M_{22}	2^{4}:A_{6}	77 = 1+16+60	Blocks of S(3,6,22)
J_{2}	U_{3}(3)	100 = 1+36+63	Suzuki chain; the action on the vertices of the Hall-Janko graph
Higman-Sims group HS	M_{22}	100 = 1+22+77	The action on the vertices of the Higman-Sims graph
M_{22}	A_{7}	176 = 1+70+105	Two classes
M_{23}	M_{21}:2 = L_{3}(4):2_{2} = PΣL(3,4)	253 = 1+42+210	Pairs of points in the 23-point permutation representation
M_{23}	2^{4}:A_{7}	253 = 1+112+140	Blocks of S(4,7,23)
McLaughlin group McL	U_{4}(3)	275 = 1+112+162	The action on the vertices of the McLaughlin graph
M_{24}	M_{22}:2	276 = 1+44+231	Pairs of points in the 24-point permutation representation
G_{2}(3)	U_{3}(3):2	351 = 1+126+244	Two classes
G_{2}(4)	J_{2}	416 = 1+100+315	Suzuki chain
M_{24}	M_{12}:2	1288 = 1+495+792	Pairs of complementary dodecads in the 24-point permutation representation
Suzuki group Suz	G_{2}(4)	1782 = 1+416+1365	Suzuki chain
G_{2}(4)	U_{3}(4):2	2016 = 1+975+1040	
Co_{2}	PSU_{6}(2):2	2300 = 1+891+1408	
Rudvalis group Ru	^{2}F_{4}(2)	4060 = 1+1755+2304	
Fi_{22}	2.PSU_{6}(2)	3510 = 1+693+2816	3-transpositions
Fi_{22}	Ω_{7}(3)	14080 = 1+3159+10920	Two classes
Fi_{23}	2.Fi_{22}	31671 = 1+3510+28160	3-transpositions
G_{2}(8).3	SU_{3}(8).6	130816 = 1+32319+98496	
Fi_{23}	PΩ_{8}^{+}(3).S_{3}	137632 = 1+28431+109200	
Fi_{24}'	Fi_{23}	306936 = 1+31671+275264	3-transpositions
