= Fischer group Fi23 =

Sporadic simple group

In the area of modern algebra known as group theory, the Fischer group Fi_{23} is a sporadic simple group of order

4,089,470,473,293,004,800
= 2^{18} · 3^{13} · 5^{2} · 7 · 11 · 13 · 17 · 23
≈ 4×10^{18}.

== History ==
Fi_{23} is one of the 26 sporadic groups and is one of the three Fischer groups introduced by Bernd Fischer (1971, 1976) while investigating 3-transposition groups.

The Schur multiplier and the outer automorphism group are both trivial.

== Representations ==
The Fischer group Fi_{23} has a rank 3 action on a graph of 31671 vertices corresponding to 3-transpositions, with point stabilizer the double cover of the Fischer group Fi22. It has a second rank-3 action on 137632 points

Fi_{23} is the centralizer of a transposition in the Fischer group Fi24. When realizing Fi_{24} as a subgroup of the Monster group, the full centralizer of a transposition is the double cover of the Baby monster group. As a result, Fi_{23} is a subgroup of the Baby monster, and is the normalizer of a certain S_{3} group in the Monster.

The smallest faithful complex representation has dimension $782$. The group has an irreducible representation of dimension 253 over the field with 3 elements.

== Generalized Monstrous Moonshine ==
Conway and Norton suggested in their 1979 paper that monstrous moonshine is not limited to the monster, but that similar phenomena may be found for other groups. Larissa Queen and others subsequently found that one can construct the expansions of many Hauptmoduln from simple combinations of dimensions of sporadic groups. For Fi_{23}, the relevant McKay-Thompson series is $T_{3A}(\tau)$ where one can set the constant term a(0) = 42 (OEIS: A030197),

$$\begin{align}j_{3A}(\tau)
&=T_{3A}(\tau)+42\\
&=\left(\left(\tfrac{\eta(\tau)}{\eta(3\tau)}\right)^{6}+3^3 \left(\tfrac{\eta(2\tau)}{\eta(\tau)}\right)^{6}\right)^2\\
&=\frac{1}{q} + 42 + 783q + 8672q^2 +65367q^3+371520q^4+\dots
\end{align}$$

and η(τ) is the Dedekind eta function.

== Maximal subgroups ==
Kleidman, Parker & Wilson (1989) found the 14 conjugacy classes of maximal subgroups of Fi_{23} as follows:

Maximal subgroups of Fi_{23}
No.	Structure	Order	Index	Comments
1	2.Fi_{22}	129,123,503,308,800 = 2^{18}·3^{9}·5^{2}·7·11·13	31,671 = 3^{4}·17·23	centralizer of an involution of class 2A
2	O^{+}_{8}(3):S_{3}	29,713,078,886,400 = 2^{13}·3^{13}·5^{2}·7·13	137,632 = 2^{5}·11·17·23	
3	2^{2}.U_{6}(2).2	73,574,645,760 = 2^{18}·3^{6}·5·7·11	55,582,605 = 3^{7}·5·13·17·23	centralizer of an involution of class 2B
4	S_{8}(2)	47,377,612,800 = 2^{16}·3^{5}·5^{2}·7·17	86,316,516 = 2^{2}·3^{8}·11·13·23	
5	O_{7}(3) × S_{3}	27,512,110,080 = 2^{10}·3^{10}·5·7·13	148,642,560 = 2^{8}·3^{3}·5·11·17·23	normalizer of a subgroup of order 3 (class 3A)
6	2^{11}.M_{23}	20,891,566,080 = 2^{18}·3^{2}·5·7·11·23	195,747,435 = 3^{11}·5·13·17	
7	3^{1+8}.2^{1+6}.3^{1+2}.2S_{4}	3,265,173,504 = 2^{11}·3^{13}	1,252,451,200 = 2^{7}·5^{2}·7·11·13·17·23	normalizer of a subgroup of order 3 (class 3B)
8	[3^{10}].(L_{3}(3) × 2)	663,238,368 = 2^{5}·3^{13}·13	6,165,913,600 = 2^{13}·5^{2}·7·11·17·23	
9	S_{12}	479,001,600 = 2^{10}·3^{5}·5^{2}·7·11	8,537,488,128 = 2^{8}·3^{8}·13·17·23	
10	(2^{2} × 2^{1+8}).(3 × U_{4}(2)).2	318,504,960 = 2^{18}·3^{5}·5	12,839,581,755 = 3^{8}·5·7·11·13·17·23	centralizer of an involution of class 2C
11	2^{6+8}:(A_{7} × S_{3})	247,726,080 = 2^{18}·3^{3}·5·7	16,508,033,685 = 3^{10}·5·11·13·17·23	
12	S_{6}(2) × S_{4}	34,836,480 = 2^{12}·3^{5}·5·7	117,390,461,760 = 2^{6}·3^{8}·5·11·13·17·23	
13	S_{4}(4):4	3,916,800 = 2^{10}·3^{2}·5^{2}·17	1,044,084,577,536 = 2^{8}·3^{11}·7·11·13·23	
14	L_{2}(23)	6,072 = 2^{3}·3·11·23	673,496,454,758,400 = 2^{15}·3^{12}·5^{2}·7·13·17	
