= Fischer group Fi24 =

Sporadic simple group

In the area of modern algebra known as group theory, the Fischer group Fi_{24} or F_{24}′ or F_{3+} is a sporadic simple group of order

1,255,205,709,190,661,721,292,800
= 2^{21} · 3^{16} · 5^{2} · 7^{3} · 11 · 13 · 17 · 23 · 29
≈ 1×10^{24}.

== History and properties ==
Fi_{24} is one of the 26 sporadic groups and is the largest of the three Fischer groups introduced by Bernd Fischer (1971, 1976) while investigating 3-transposition groups. It is the 3rd largest of the sporadic groups (after the Monster group and Baby Monster group).

The outer automorphism group has order 2, and the Schur multiplier has order 3. The automorphism group is a 3-transposition group Fi_{24}, containing the simple group with index 2.

The centralizer of an element of order 3 in the monster group is a triple cover of the sporadic simple group Fi_{24}, as a result of which the prime 3 plays a special role in its theory.

== Representations ==
The centralizer of an element of order 3 in the monster group is a triple cover of the Fischer group, as a result of which the prime 3 plays a special role in its theory. In particular it acts on a vertex operator algebra over the field with 3 elements.

The simple Fischer group has a rank 3 action on a graph of 306936 (=2^{3}.3^{3}.7^{2}.29) vertices corresponding to the 3-transpositions of Fi_{24}, with point stabilizer the Fischer group Fi_{23}.

The triple cover has a complex representation of dimension 783. When reduced modulo 3 this has 1-dimensional invariant subspaces and quotient spaces, giving an irreducible representation of dimension 781 over the field with 3 elements.

== Generalized Monstrous Moonshine ==
Conway and Norton suggested in their 1979 paper that monstrous moonshine is not limited to the monster, but that similar phenomena may be found for other groups. Larissa Queen and others subsequently found that one can construct the expansions of many Hauptmoduln from simple combinations of dimensions of sporadic groups. For Fi_{24} (as well as Fi_{23}), the relevant McKay-Thompson series is $T_{3A}(\tau)$ where one can set the constant term a(0) = 42 (OEIS: A030197),

$$\begin{align}j_{3A}(\tau)
&=T_{3A}(\tau)+42\\
&=\left(\left(\tfrac{\eta(\tau)}{\eta(3\tau)}\right)^{6}+3^3 \left(\tfrac{\eta(2\tau)}{\eta(\tau)}\right)^{6}\right)^2\\
&=\frac{1}{q} + 42 + 783q + 8672q^2 +65367q^3+371520q^4+1741655q^5+\dots
\end{align}$$

== Maximal subgroups ==
Linton & Wilson (1991) found the 25 conjugacy classes of maximal subgroups of Fi_{24}' as follows:

Maximal subgroups of Fi_{24}'
No.	Structure	Order	Index	Comments
1	Fi_{23}	4,089,470,473,293,004,800 = 2^{18}·3^{13}·5^{2}·7·11·13·17·23	306,936 = 2^{3}·3^{3}·7^{2}·29	centralizer of a 3-transposition in the automorphism group Fi_{24}
2	2^{·}Fi_{22}:2	258,247,006,617,600 = 2^{19}·3^{9}·5^{2}·7·11·13	4,860,485,028 = 2^{2}·3^{7}·7^{2}·17·23·29	centralizer of an involution (bi-transposition)
3	(3xO^{+}_{8}(3):3):2	89,139,236,659,200 = 2^{13}·3^{14}·5^{2}·7·13	14,081,405,184 = 2^{8}·3^{2}·7^{2}·11·17·23·29	normalizer of a subgroup of order 3
4	O^{–}_{10}(2)	25,015,379,558,400 = 2^{20}·3^{6}·5^{2}·7·11·17	50,177,360,142 = 2·3^{10}·7^{2}·13·23·29	
5	3^{7 ·}O_{7}(3)	10,028,164,124,160 = 2^{9}·3^{16}·5·7·13	125,168,046,080 = 2^{12}·5·7^{2}·11·17·23·29	
6	3^{1+10}:U_{5}(2):2	4,848,782,653,440 = 2^{11}·3^{16}·5·11	258,870,277,120 = 2^{10}·5·7^{3}·13·17·23·29	normalizer of a subgroup of order 3
7	2^{11·}M_{24}	501,397,585,920 = 2^{21}·3^{3}·5·7·11·23	2,503,413,946,215 = 3^{13}·5·7^{2}·13·17·29	
8	2^{2 ·}U_{6}(2):S_{3}	220,723,937,280 = 2^{18}·3^{7}·5·7·11	5,686,767,482,760 = 2^{3}·3^{9}·5·7^{2}·13·17·23·29	centralizer of an involution in the automorphism group Fi_{24} (tri-transposition)
9	2^{1+12 ·}3^{·}U_{4}(3).2	160,526,499,840 = 2^{21}·3^{7}·5·7	7,819,305,288,795 = 3^{9}·5·7^{2}·11·13·17·23·29	centralizer of an involution (tetra-transposition)
10	[3^{13}]:(L_{3}(3)x2)	17,907,435,936 = 2^{5}·3^{16}·13	70,094,105,804,800 = 2^{16}·5^{2}·7^{3}·11·17·23·29	
11	3^{2+4+8}.(A_{5}x2A_{4}).2	13,774,950,720 = 2^{6}·3^{16}·5	91,122,337,546,240 = 2^{15}·5·7^{3}·11·13·17·23·29	
12	(A_{4}xO^{+}_{8}(2):3):2	12,541,132,800 = 2^{15}·3^{7}·5^{2}·7	100,087,107,696,576 = 2^{6}·3^{9}·7^{2}·11·13·17·23·29	
13, 14	He:2	8,060,774,400 = 2^{11}·3^{3}·5^{2}·7^{3}·17	155,717,756,992,512 = 2^{10}·3^{13}·11·13·23·29	two classes, fused by an outer automorphism
15	2^{3+12}.(L_{3}(2)xA_{6})	1,981,808,640 = 2^{21}·3^{3}·5·7	633,363,728,392,395 = 3^{13}·5·7^{2}·11·13·17·23·29	
16	2^{6+8}.(S_{3}xA_{8})	1,981,808,640 = 2^{21}·3^{3}·5·7	633,363,728,392,395 = 3^{13}·5·7^{2}·11·13·17·23·29	
17	(G_{2}(3)x3^{2}:2).2	152,845,056 = 2^{8}·3^{8}·7·13	8,212,275,503,308,800 = 2^{13}·3^{8}·5^{2}·7^{2}·11·17·23·29	
18	(A_{9}xA_{5}):2	21,772,800 = 2^{9}·3^{5}·5^{2}·7	57,650,174,033,227,776 = 2^{12}·3^{11}·7^{2}·11·13·17·23·29	
19	L_{2}(8):3xA_{6}	544,320 = 2^{6}·3^{5}·5·7	2,306,006,961,329,111,040 = 2^{15}·3^{11}·5·7^{2}·11·13·17·23·29	
20	A_{7}x7:6	105,840 = 2^{4}·3^{3}·5·7^{2}	11,859,464,372,549,713,920 = 2^{17}·3^{13}·5·7·11·13·17·23·29	normalizer of a cyclic subgroup of order 7
21, 22	U_{3}(3):2	12,096 = 2^{6}·3^{3}·7	103,770,313,259,809,996,800 = 2^{15}·3^{13}·5^{2}·7^{2}·11·13·17·23·29	two classes, fused by an outer automorphism
23, 24	L_{2}(13):2	2,184 = 2^{3}·3·7·13	574,727,888,823,563,059,200 = 2^{18}·3^{15}·5^{2}·7^{2}·11·17·23·29	two classes, fused by an outer automorphism
25	29:14	406 = 2·7·29	3,091,639,677,809,511,628,800 = 2^{20}·3^{16}·5^{2}·7^{2}·11·13·17·23	normalizer of a Sylow 29-subgroup
