= Baby monster group =

Sporadic simple group

In the area of modern algebra known as group theory, the baby monster group B (or, more simply, the baby monster) is a sporadic simple group of order

4154781481226426191177580544000000
= 2^{41} · 3^{13} · 5^{6} · 7^{2} · 11 · 13 · 17 · 19 · 23 · 31 · 47
= 20! · 6!^{2} · 4! · 2^{12} · 23 · 31 · 47
≈ 4×10^{33}.

B is one of the 26 sporadic groups and has the second highest order of these, with the highest order being that of the monster group. The double cover of the baby monster is the centralizer of an element of order 2 in the monster group. The outer automorphism group of B is trivial and the Schur multiplier of B has order 2.

== History ==
The existence of this group was suggested by Bernd Fischer in unpublished work from the early 1970s during his investigation of {3,4}-transposition groups: groups generated by a class of transpositions such that the product of any two elements has order at most 4. He investigated its properties and computed its character table. The first construction of the baby monster was later realized as a permutation group on 13,571,955,000 points using a computer by Jeffrey Leon and Charles Sims. Robert Griess later found a computer-free construction using the fact that its double cover is contained in the monster group. The name "baby monster" was suggested by John Horton Conway.

== Representations ==
In characteristic 0, the 4371-dimensional representation of the baby monster does not have a nontrivial invariant algebra structure analogous to the Griess algebra, but Ryba (2007) showed that it does have such an invariant algebra structure if it is reduced modulo 2.

The smallest faithful matrix representation of the Baby Monster is of size 4370 over the finite field of order 2.

Höhn (1996) constructed a vertex operator algebra acted on by the baby monster.

== Generalized monstrous moonshine ==
Conway and Norton suggested in their 1979 paper that monstrous moonshine is not limited to the monster, but that similar phenomena may be found for other groups. Larissa Queen and others subsequently found that one can construct the expansions of many Hauptmoduln from simple combinations of dimensions of sporadic groups. For the Baby monster B or F_{2}, the relevant McKay–Thompson series is $T_{2A}(\tau)$ where one can set the constant term a(0) = 104.

$$\begin{align}j_{2A}(\tau)
&=T_{2A}(\tau)+104\\
&=\left(\left(\tfrac{\eta(\tau)}{\eta(2\tau)}\right)^{12}+2^6 \left(\tfrac{\eta(2\tau)}{\eta(\tau)}\right)^{12}\right)^2\\
&=\frac{1}{q} + 104 + 4372q + 96256q^2 +1240002q^3+10698752q^4+\cdots
\end{align}$$

and η(τ) is the Dedekind eta function.

== Maximal subgroups ==
Wilson (1999) found the 30 conjugacy classes of maximal subgroups of B which are listed in the table below.

Maximal subgroups of the Baby monster
| No. | Structure | Order | Comments |
|---|---|---|---|
| 1 | 2^{·2}E_{6}(2):2 | 306,129,918,735,099,415,756,800 = 2^{38}·3^{9}·5^{2}·7^{2}·11·13·17·19 | centralizer of an involution of class 2A; point stabilizer of the smallest permutation representation on 13,571,955,000 points; contains the normalizer (19:18) × 2 of a Sylow 19-subgroup |
| 2 | 2^{1+22}_{+}^{·}Co_{2} | 354,883,595,661,213,696,000 = 2^{41}·3^{6}·5^{3}·7·11·23 | centralizer of an involution of class 2B; contains the normalizer (23:11) × 2 of a Sylow 23-subgroup |
| 3 | Fi_{23} | 4,089,470,473,293,004,800 = 2^{18}·3^{13}·5^{2}·7·11·13·17·23 | |
| 4 | 2^{9+16}.S_{8}(2) | 1,589,728,887,019,929,600 = 2^{41}·3^{5}·5^{2}·7·17 | |
| 5 | Th | 90,745,943,887,872,000 = 2^{15}·3^{10}·5^{3}·7^{2}·13·19·31 | contains the normalizer 31:15 of a Sylow 31-subgroup |
| 6 | (2^{2} × F_{4}(2)):2 | 26,489,012,826,931,200 = 2^{27}·3^{6}·5^{2}·7^{2}·13·17 | centralizer of an involution of class 2C; contains the normalizer (17:8 × 2^{2})^{·}2 of a Sylow 17-subgroup |
| 7 | 2^{2+10+20}.(M_{22}:2 × S_{3}) | 22,858,846,741,463,040 = 2^{41}·3^{3}·5·7·11 | |
| 8 | [2^{30}].L_{5}(2) | 10,736,731,045,232,640 = 2^{40}·3^{2}·5·7·31 | |
| 9 | S_{3} × Fi_{22}:2 | 774,741,019,852,800 = 2^{19}·3^{10}·5^{2}·7·11·13 | normalizer of a subgroup of order 3 (class 3A) |
| 10 | [2^{35}].(S_{5} × L_{3}(2)) | 692,692,325,498,880 = 2^{41}·3^{2}·5·7 | |
| 11 | HN:2 | 546,061,824,000,000 = 2^{15}·3^{6}·5^{6}·7·11·19 | |
| 12 | O^{+}_{8}(3):S_{4} | 118,852,315,545,600 = 2^{15}·3^{13}·5^{2}·7·13 | |
| 13 | 3^{1+8}_{+}.2^{1+6}_{–}^{·}U_{4}(2).2 | 130,606,940,160 = 2^{14}·3^{13}·5 | normalizer of a subgroup of order 3 (class 3B) |
| 14 | (3^{2}:D_{8} × U_{4}(3).2.2).2 | 1,881,169,920 = 2^{13}·3^{8}·5·7 | |
| 15 | 5:4 × HS:2 | 1,774,080,000 = 2^{12}·3^{2}·5^{4}·7·11 | normalizer of a subgroup of order 5 (class 5A) |
| 16 | S_{4} × ^{2}F_{4}(2) | 862,617,600 = 2^{15}·3^{4}·5^{2}·13 | contains the normalizer 13:12 × S_{4} of a Sylow 13-subgroup |
| 17 | [3^{11}].(S_{4} × 2S_{4}) | 204,073,344 = 2^{7}·3^{13} | |
| 18 | S_{5} × M_{22}:2 | 106,444,800 = 2^{11}·3^{3}·5^{2}·7·11 | contains the normalizer 11:10 × S_{5} of a Sylow 11-subgroup |
| 19 | (S_{6} × L_{3}(4):2).2 | 58,060,800 = 2^{11}·3^{3}·5^{2}·7·11 | |
| 20 | 5^{3·}L_{3}(5) | 46,500,000 = 2^{5}·3·5^{6}·31 | |
| 21 | 5^{1+4}_{+}.2^{1+4}_{–}.A_{5}.4 | 24,000,000 = 2^{9}·3·5^{6} | normalizer of a subgroup of order 5 (class 5B) |
| 22 | (S_{6} × S_{6}).4 | 2,073,600 = 2^{10}·3^{4}·5^{2} | |
| 23 | 5^{2}:4S_{4} × S_{5} | 288,000 = 2^{8}·3^{2}·5^{3} | |
| 24 | L_{2}(49).2_{3} | 117,600 = 2^{5}·3·5^{2}·7^{2} | |
| 25 | L_{2}(31) | 14,880 = 2^{5}·3·5·31 | contains the normalizer 31:15 of a Sylow 31-subgroup |
| 26 | M_{11} | 7,920 = 2^{4}·3^{2}·5·11 | |
| 27 | L_{3}(3) | 5,616 = 2^{4}·3^{3}·13 | |
| 28 | L_{2}(17):2 | 4,896 = 2^{5}·3^{2}·17 | |
| 29 | L_{2}(11):2 | 1,320 = 2^{3}·3·5·11 | |
| 30 | 47:23 | 1,081 = 23·47 | normalizer of a Sylow 47-subgroup |
