= Gewirtz graph =

- Some embeddings with 7-fold symmetry. No 8-fold or 14-fold symmetry is possible.
- Vertices: 56
- Edges: 280
- Radius: 2
- Diameter: 2
- Girth: 4
- Automorphisms: 80,640
- Chromatic number: 4
- Properties: Strongly regular Hamiltonian; Triangle-free; Vertex-transitive; Edge-transitive; Distance-transitive.

The Gewirtz graph is a strongly regular graph with 56 vertices and valency 10. It is named after the mathematician Allan Gewirtz, who described the graph in his dissertation.

== Construction ==
The Gewirtz graph can be constructed as follows. Consider the unique S(3, 6, 22) Steiner system, with 22 elements and 77 blocks. Choose an arbitrary element, and let the vertices be the 56 blocks not containing it. Two blocks are adjacent when they are disjoint.

With this construction, one can embed the Gewirtz graph in the Higman–Sims graph.

== Properties ==
The characteristic polynomial of the Gewirtz graph is

$$(x-10)(x-2)^{35}(x+4)^{20}. \,$$

Therefore, it is an integral graph.

The Gewirtz graph is also determined by its spectrum.

The independence number is 16.
