= Fischer group Fi22 =

Sporadic simple group

In the area of modern algebra known as group theory, the Fischer group Fi_{22} is a sporadic simple group of order

64,561,751,654,400
= 2^{17} · 3^{9} · 5^{2} · 7 · 11 · 13
≈ 6×10^{13}.

== History ==
Fi_{22} is one of the 26 sporadic groups and is the smallest of the three Fischer groups. It was introduced by Bernd Fischer (1971, 1976) while investigating 3-transposition groups.

The outer automorphism group has order 2, and the Schur multiplier has order 6.

== Representations ==
The Fischer group Fi_{22} has a rank 3 action on a graph of 3510 vertices corresponding to its 3-transpositions, with point stabilizer the double cover of the group PSU_{6}(2). It also has two rank 3 actions on 14080 points, exchanged by an outer automorphism.

Fi_{22} has an irreducible real representation of dimension 78. Reducing an integral form of this mod 3 gives a representation of Fi_{22} over the field with 3 elements, whose quotient by the 1-dimensional space of fixed vectors is a 77-dimensional irreducible representation.

The perfect triple cover of Fi_{22} has an irreducible representation of dimension 27 over the field with 4 elements. This arises from the fact that Fi_{22} is a subgroup of ^{2}E_{6}(2^{2}). All the ordinary and modular character tables of Fi_{22} have been computed. Hiss & White (1994) found the 5-modular character table, and Noeske (2007) found the 2- and 3-modular character tables.

The automorphism group of Fi_{22} centralizes an element of order 3 in the baby monster group.

== Generalized Monstrous Moonshine ==
Conway and Norton suggested in their 1979 paper that monstrous moonshine is not limited to the monster, but that similar phenomena may be found for other groups. Larissa Queen and others subsequently found that one can construct the expansions of many Hauptmoduln from simple combinations of dimensions of sporadic groups. For Fi_{22}, the McKay-Thompson series is $T_{6A}(\tau)$ where one can set a(0) = 10 (OEIS: A007254),

$$\begin{align}j_{6A}(\tau)
&=T_{6A}(\tau)+10\\
&=\left(\left(\tfrac{\eta(\tau)\,\eta(3\tau)}{\eta(2\tau)\,\eta(6\tau)}\right)^{3}+2^3 \left(\tfrac{\eta(2\tau)\,\eta(6\tau)}{\eta(\tau)\,\eta(3\tau)}\right)^{3}\right)^2\\
&=\left(\left(\tfrac{\eta(\tau)\,\eta(2\tau)}{\eta(3\tau)\,\eta(6\tau)}\right)^{2}+3^2 \left(\tfrac{\eta(3\tau)\,\eta(6\tau)}{\eta(\tau)\,\eta(2\tau)}\right)^{2}\right)^2-4\\
&=\frac{1}{q} + 10 + 79q + 352q^2 +1431q^3+4160q^4+13015q^5+\dots
\end{align}$$

and η(τ) is the Dedekind eta function.

Maximal subgroups of Fi_{22}
No.	Structure	Order	Index	Comments
1	2^{·}U_{6}(2)	18,393,661,440 = 2^{16}·3^{6}·5·7·11	3,510 = 2·3^{3}·5·13	centralizer of an involution of class 2A
2,3	O_{7}(3)	4,585,351,680 = 2^{9}·3^{9}·5·7·13	14,080 = 2^{8}·5·11	two classes, fused by an outer automorphism
4	O^{+}_{8}(2):S_{3}	1,045,094,400 = 2^{13}·3^{6}·5^{2}·7	61,776 = 2^{4}·3^{3}·11·13	centralizer of an outer automorphism of order 2 (class 2D)
5	2^{10}:M_{22}	454,164,480 = 2^{17}·3^{2}·5·7·11	142,155 = 3^{7}·5·13	
6	2^{6}:S_{6}(2)	92,897,280 = 2^{15}·3^{4}·5·7	694,980 = 2^{2}·3^{5}·5·11·13	
7	(2 × 2^{1+8}):(U_{4}(2):2)	53,084,160 = 2^{17}·3^{4}·5	1,216,215 = 3^{5}·5·7·11·13	centralizer of an involution of class 2B
8	U_{4}(3):2 × S_{3}	39,191,040 = 2^{9}·3^{7}·5·7	1,647,360 = 2^{8}·3^{2}·5·11·13	normalizer of a subgroup of order 3 (class 3A)
9	^{2}F_{4}(2)'	17,971,200 = 2^{11}·3^{3}·5^{2}·13	3,592,512 = 2^{6}·3^{6}·7·11	the Tits group
10	2^{5+8}:(S_{3} × A_{6})	17,694,720 = 2^{17}·3^{3}·5	3,648,645 = 3^{6}·5·7·11·13	
11	3^{1+6}:2^{3+4}:3^{2}:2	5,038,848 = 2^{8}·3^{9}	12,812,800 = 2^{9}·5^{2}·7·11·13	normalizer of a subgroup of order 3 (class 3B)
12,13	S_{10}	3,628,800 = 2^{8}·3^{4}·5^{2}·7	17,791,488 = 2^{9}·3^{5}·11·13	two classes, fused by an outer automorphism
14	M_{12}	95,040 = 2^{6}·3^{3}·5·11	679,311,360 = 2^{11}·3^{6}·5·7·13	
