= M22 graph =

Strongly regular graph

M_{22} graph, Mesner graph
- Named after: Mathieu group M_{22}, Dale M. Mesner
- Vertices: 77
- Edges: 616

The M_{22} graph, also called the Mesner graph, Witt graph, or 77-graph, is the unique strongly regular graph with parameters (77, 16, 0, 4). It is constructed from the Steiner system (3, 6, 22) by representing its 77 blocks as vertices and joining two vertices iff they have no terms in common, or by deleting a vertex and its neighbors from the Higman–Sims graph.

For any term, the family of blocks that contain that term forms an independent set in this graph, with 21 vertices. In a result analogous to the Erdős–Ko–Rado theorem (which can be formulated in terms of independent sets in Kneser graphs), these are the unique maximum independent sets in this graph.

It is one of seven known triangle-free strongly regular graphs. Its graph spectrum is (−6)^{21}2^{55}16^{1}, and its automorphism group is the Mathieu group M22.

== See also ==
- Cameron graph
- Higman–Sims graph
- Gewirtz graph
