= Suzuki sporadic group =

Sporadic simple group

In the area of modern algebra known as group theory, the Suzuki group Suz or Sz is a sporadic simple group of order

448,345,497,600 = 2^{13} · 3^{7} · 5^{2} · 7 · 11 · 13 ≈ 4×10^{11}.

== History ==
Suz is one of the 26 Sporadic groups and was discovered by Suzuki (1969) as a rank 3 permutation group on 1782 points with point stabilizer G_{2}(4). It is not related to the Suzuki groups of Lie type. The Schur multiplier has order 6 and the outer automorphism group has order 2.

== Complex Leech lattice ==
The 24-dimensional Leech lattice has a fixed-point-free automorphism of order 3. Identifying this with a complex cube root of 1 makes the Leech lattice into a 12 dimensional lattice over the Eisenstein integers, called the complex Leech lattice. The automorphism group of the complex Leech lattice is the universal cover 6 · Suz of the Suzuki group. This makes the group 6 · Suz · 2 into a maximal subgroup of Conway's group Co_{0} = 2 · Co_{1} of automorphisms of the Leech lattice, and shows that it has two complex irreducible representations of dimension 12. The group 6 · Suz acting on the complex Leech lattice is analogous to the group 2 · Co_{1} acting on the Leech lattice.

== Suzuki chain ==
The Suzuki chain or Suzuki tower is the following tower of rank 3 permutation groups from (Suzuki 1969), each of which is the point stabilizer of the next.

- G_{2}(2) = U(3, 3) · 2 has a rank 3 action on 36 = 1 + 14 + 21 points with point stabilizer PSL(3, 2) · 2
- J_{2} · 2 has a rank 3 action on 100 = 1 + 36 + 63 points with point stabilizer G_{2}(2)
- G_{2}(4) · 2 has a rank 3 action on 416 = 1 + 100 + 315 points with point stabilizer J_{2} · 2
- Suz · 2 has a rank 3 action on 1782 = 1 + 416 + 1365 points with point stabilizer G_{2}(4) · 2

== Maximal subgroups ==
Wilson (1983) found the 17 conjugacy classes of maximal subgroups of Suz as follows:

Maximal subgroups of Suz
No.	Structure	Order	Index	Comments
1	G_{2}(4)	251,596,800 = 2^{12}·3^{3}·5^{2}·7·13	1,782 = 2·3^{4}·11	
2	3_{2}^{·}U(4, 3) : 2'_{3}	19,595,520 = 2^{8}·3^{7}·5·7	22,880 = 2^{5}·5·11·13	normalizer of a subgroup of order 3 (class 3A)
3	U(5, 2)	13,685,760 = 2^{10}·3^{5}·5·11	32,760 = 2^{3}·3^{2}·5·7·13	
4	2^{1+6}_{–}^{·}U(4, 2)	3,317,760 = 2^{13}·3^{4}·5	135,135 = 3^{3}·5·7·11·13	centralizer of an involution of class 2A
5	3^{5} : M_{11}	1,924,560 = 2^{4}·3^{7}·5·11	232,960 = 2^{9}·5·7·13	
6	J_{2} : 2	1,209,600 = 2^{8}·3^{3}·5^{2}·7	370,656 = 2^{5}·3^4·11·13	the subgroup fixed by an outer involution of class 2C
7	2^{4+6} : 3A_{6}	1,105,920 = 2^{13}·3^{3}·5	405,405 = 3^{4}·5·7·11·13	
8	(A_{4} × L_{3}(4)) : 2	483,840 = 2^{9}·3^{3}·5·7	926,640 = 2^{4}·3^{4}·5·11·13	
9	2^{2+8} : (A_{5} × S_{3})	368,640 = 2^{13}·3^{2}·5	1,216,215 = 3^{5}·5·7·11·13	
10	M_{12} : 2	190,080 = 2^{7}·3^{3}·5·11	2,358,720 = 2^{6}·3^{4}·5·7·13	the subgroup fixed by an outer involution of class 2D
11	3^{2+4} : 2(A_{4} × 2^{2}).2	139,968 = 2^{6}·3^{7}	3,203,200 = 2^{7}·5^{2}·7·11·13	
12	(A_{6} × A_{5}) · 2	43,200 = 2^{6}·3^{3}·5^{2}	10,378,368 = 2^{7}·3^4·7·11·13	
13	(A_{6} × 3^{2} : 4)^{·}2	25,920 = 2^{6}·3^{4}·5	17,297,280 = 2^{7}·3^{3}·5·7·11·13	
14,15	L_{3}(3) : 2	11,232 = 2^{5}·3^{3}·13	39,916,800 = 2^{8}·3^{4}·5^2·7·11	two classes, fused by an outer automorphism
16	L_{2}(25)	7,800 = 2^{3}·3·5^{2}·13	57,480,192 = 2^{10}·3^{6}·7·11	
17	A_{7}	2,520 = 2^{3}·3^{2}·5·7	177,914,880 = 2^{10}·3^{5}·5·11·13	

== Bibliography ==
- Conway, J. H.; Curtis, R. T.; Norton, S. P.; Parker, R. A.; and Wilson, R. A.: "Atlas of Finite Groups: Maximal Subgroups and Ordinary Characters for Simple Groups." Oxford, England 1985.
- Griess, Robert L. Jr. (1998), Twelve sporadic groups, Springer Monographs in Mathematics, Berlin, New York: Springer-Verlag, ISBN 978-3-540-62778-4, MR 1707296
- Suzuki, Michio (1969), "A simple group of order 448,345,497,600", in Brauer, R.; Sah, Chih-han (eds.), Theory of Finite Groups (Symposium, Harvard Univ., Cambridge, Mass., 1968), Benjamin, New York, pp. 113–119, MR 0241527
- Wilson, Robert A. (1983), "The complex Leech lattice and maximal subgroups of the Suzuki group", Journal of Algebra, 84 (1): 151–188, doi:10.1016/0021-8693(83)90074-1, ISSN 0021-8693, MR 0716777
- Wilson, Robert A. (2009), The finite simple groups, Graduate Texts in Mathematics 251, vol. 251, Berlin, New York: Springer-Verlag, doi:10.1007/978-1-84800-988-2, ISBN 978-1-84800-987-5, Zbl 1203.20012
