= Higman–Sims group =

Sporadic simple group

In the area of modern algebra known as group theory, the Higman–Sims group HS is a sporadic simple group of order

44,352,000 = 2^{9} · 3^{2} · 5^{3} · 7 · 11
≈ 4×10^{7}.

The Schur multiplier has order 2, the outer automorphism group has order 2, and the group 2.HS.2 appears as an involution centralizer in the Harada–Norton group.

== History ==
HS is one of the 26 sporadic groups and was found by Donald G. Higman and Charles C. Sims (1968). They were attending a presentation by Marshall Hall on the Hall–Janko group J_{2}. It happens that J_{2} acts as a permutation group on the Hall–Janko graph of 100 points, the stabilizer of one point being a subgroup with two other orbits of lengths 36 and 63. Inspired by this they decided to check for other rank 3 permutation groups on 100 points. They soon focused on a possible one containing the Mathieu group M_{22}, which has permutation representations on 22 and 77 points. (The latter representation arises because the M_{22} Steiner system has 77 blocks.) By putting together these two representations, they found HS, with a one-point stabilizer isomorphic to M_{22}.

HS is the simple subgroup of index two in the group of automorphisms of the Higman–Sims graph. The Higman–Sims graph has 100 nodes, so the Higman–Sims group HS is a transitive group of permutations of a 100 element set. The smallest faithful complex representation of HS has dimension 22.

Graham Higman (1969) independently discovered the group as a doubly transitive permutation group acting on a certain "geometry" on 176 points.

== Construction ==
GAP code to build the Higman-Sims group is presented as an example in the GAP documentation itself.

The Higman-Sims group can be constructed with the following two generators:

(1,50,65) (2,89,62,52,88,25) (3,46,57,18,74,55) (4,45,10,70,56,39) (5,97,77) (6,84,8,48,99,67) (7,26,92,28,20,100) (9,30,79,66,49,95) (11,72) (12,94,98,27,83,93) (13,31,61,59,40,47) (14,51,68,44,16,34) (15,38) (17,82,87) (19,76,73,71,63,32) (21,37,58,69,75,35) (22,53,81) (23,33,54) (24,43,80,78,29,86) (42,64) (60,90,96) (85,91)

and

(1,65,44,13,34,57) (2,10,39,54,42,84) (3,15,69,63,37,11) (5,21,79) (6,89,49,64,46,80) (7,70,93,29,8,38) (9,81,17,23,77,59) (12,68,66,75,96,82) (14,18,95,43,76,32) (16,33,99,26,92,48) (19,50) (20,97,83) (22,88,85,53,24,56) (25,62,67) (27,98) (28,55) (30,58,71,86,94,90) (31,87,52,78,100,60) (35,61,51) (36,73,72) (40,74) (41,45,47)

== Relationship to Conway groups ==
Conway (1968) identified the Higman–Sims group as a subgroup of the Conway group Co_{0}. In Co_{0} HS arises as a pointwise stabilizer of a 2-3-3 triangle, one whose edges (differences of vertices) are type 2 and 3 vectors. HS thus is a subgroup of each of the Conway groups Co_{0}, Co_{2} and Co_{3}.

Wilson (2009) (p. 208) shows that the group HS is well-defined. In the Leech lattice, suppose a type 3 point v is fixed by an instance of Co_{3}. Count the type 2 points w such that the inner product v·w = 2 (and thus v-w is type 3). He shows that their number is 11,178 = 2⋅3^{5}⋅23 and that this Co_{3} is transitive on these w.

|HS| = |Co_{3}| / 11,178 = 44,352,000.

In fact, |HS| = 100 |M_{22}|, and there are instances of HS including a permutation matrix representation of the Mathieu group M_{22}.

If an instance of HS in Co_{0} fixes a particular point of type 3, this point is found in 276 triangles of type 2-2-3 that this copy of HS permutes in orbits of 176 and 100. This fact leads to Graham Higman's construction as well as to the Higman–Sims graph. HS is doubly transitive on the 176 and rank 3 on the 100.

A 2-3-3 triangle defines a 2-dimensional subspace fixed pointwise by HS. The standard representation of HS can thus be reduced to a 22-dimensional one.

=== A Higman-Sims graph ===
Wilson (2009) (p. 210) gives an example of a Higman-Sims graph within the Leech lattice, permuted by the representation of M_{22} on the last 22 coordinates:

- 22 points of shape (1, 1, −3, 1^{21})
- 77 points of shape (2, 2, 2^{6}, 0^{16})
- A 100th point (4, 4, 0^{22})

Differences of adjacent points are of type 3; those of non-adjacent ones are of type 2.

Here, HS fixes a 2-3-3 triangle with vertices x = (5, 1^{23}), y = (1, 5, 1^{22}), and z the origin. x and y are of type 3 while x-y = (4, −4, 0^{22}) is of type 2. Any vertex of the graph differs from x, y, and z by vectors of type 2.

=== Two classes of involutions ===
An involution in the subgroup M_{22} transposes 8 pairs of co-ordinates. As a permutation matrix in Co_{0} it has trace 8. It can shown that it moves 80 of the 100 vertices of the Higman-Sims graph. No transposed pair of vertices is an edge in the graph.

There is another class of involutions, of trace 0, that move all 100 vertices. As permutations in the alternating group A_{100}, being products of an odd number (25) of double transpositions, these involutions lift to elements of order 4 in the double cover 2.A_{100}. HS thus has a double cover 2.HS, which is not related to the double cover of the subgroup M_{22}.

== Maximal subgroups ==
Magliveras (1971) found the 12 conjugacy classes of maximal subgroups of HS as follows:

Maximal subgroups of HS
No.	Subgroup	Order	Index	Orbits on Higman-Sims graph	Comments
1	M_{22}	443,520 = 2^{7}·3^{2}·5·7·11	100 = 2^{2}·5^{2}	1, 22, 77	one-point stabilizer on Higman-Sims graph
2,3	U_{3}(5):2	252,000 = 2^{5}·3^{2}·5^{3}·7	176 = 2^{4}·11	imprimitive on pair of Hoffman-Singleton graphs of 50 vertices each	one-point stabilizer in doubly transitive representation of degree 176; two classes, fused in HS:2
4	L_{3}(4).2	40,320 = 2^{7}·3^{2}·5·7	1,100 = 2^{2}·5^{2}·11	2, 42, 56	stabilizer of edge
5	S_{8}	40,320 = 2^{7}·3^{2}·5·7	1,100 = 2^{2}·5^{2}·11	30, 70	centralizer of an outer automorphism of order 2 (class 2C)
6	2^{4}.S_{6}	11,520 = 2^{8}·3^{2}·5	3,850 = 2·5^{2}·7·11	2, 6, 32, 60	stabilizer of non-edge
7	4^{3}:L_{3}(2)	10,752 = 2^{9}·3·7	4,125 = 3·5^{3}·11	8, 28, 64	
8,9	M_{11}	7,920 = 2^{4}·3^{2}·5·11	5,600 = 2^{5}·5^{2}·7	12, 22, 66	two classes, fused in HS:2
10	4.2^{4}.S_{5}	7,680 = 2^{9}·3·5	5,775 = 3·5^{2}·7·11	20, 80	centralizer of involution (class 2A) moving 80 vertices of Higman–Sims graph
11	2 × A_{6}.2^{2}	2,880 = 2^{6}·3^{2}·5	15,400 = 2^{3}·5^{2}·7·11	40, 60	centralizer of involution (class 2B) moving all 100 vertices
12	5:4 × A_{5}	1,200 = 2^{4}·3·5^{2}	36,960 = 2^{5}·3·5·7·11	imprimitive on 5 blocks of 20	normalizer of a subgroup of order 5 (class 5B)

== Conjugacy classes ==
Traces of matrices in a standard 24-dimensional representation of HS are shown. Listed are 2 permutation representations: on the 100 vertices of the Higman–Sims graph, and on the 176 points of Graham Higman's geometry.

Class	Order of centralizer	No. elements	Trace	On 100	On 176	
1A	44,352,000	1 = 1	24			
2A	7,680	5775 = 3 · 5^{2} · 7 · 11	8	1^{20},2^{40}	1^{16},2^{80}	
2B	2,880	15400 = 2^{3} · 5^{2} · 5 · 7 · 11	0	2^{50}	1^{12}, 2^{82}	
3A	360	123200 = 2^{6} · 5^{2} · 7 · 11	6	1^{10},3^{30}	1^{5},3^{57}	
4A	3,840	11550 = 2 · 3 · 5^{2} · 7 · 11	-4	2^{10}4^{20}	1^{16},4^{40}	
4B	256	173250 = 2 · 3^{2} · 5^{3} · 7 · 11	4	1^{8},2^{6},4^{20}	2^{8},4^{40}	
4C	64	693000 = 2^{3} · 3^{2} · 5^{3} · 7 · 11	4	1^{4},2^{8},4^{20}	1^{4},2^{6},4^{40}	
5A	500	88704 = 2^{7} · 3^{2} · 7 · 11	-1	5^{20}	1,5^{35}	
5B	300	147840 = 2^{7} · 3 · 5 · 7 · 11	4	5^{20}	1^{6},5^{34}	
5C	25	1774080 = 2^{9} · 3^{2} · 5 · 7	4	1^{5},5^{19}	1,5^{35}	
6A	36	1232000 = 2^{7} · 5^{3} · 7 · 11	0	2^{5},6^{15}	1^{3},2,3^{3},6^{27}	
6B	24	1848000 = 2^{6} · 3 · 5^{3} · 7 · 11	2	1^{2},2^{4},3^{6},6^{12}	1, 2^{2},3^{5},6^{26}	
7A	7	6336000 = 2^{9} · 3^{2} · 5^{3} · 11	3	1^{2},7^{14}	1,7^{25}	
8A	16	2772000 = 2^{5} · 3^{2} · 5^{3} · 7 · 11	2	1^{2},2^{3},4^{3},8^{10}	4^{4}, 8^{20}	
8B	16	2772000 = 2^{5} · 3^{2} · 5^{3} · 7 · 11	2	2^{2},4^{4},8^{10}	1^{2},2,4^{3},8^{20}	
8C	16	2772000 = 2^{5} · 3^{2} · 5^{3} · 7 · 11	2	2^{2},4^{4},8^{10}	1^{2} 2, 4^{3}, 8^{20}	
10A	20	2217600 = 2^{7} · 3^{2} · 5^{2} · 7 · 11	3	5^{4},10^{8}	1,5^{3},10^{16}	
10B	20	2217600 = 2^{7} · 3^{2} · 5^{2} · 7 · 11	0	10^{10}	1^{2},2^{2},5^{2},10^{16}	
11A	11	4032000 = 2^{9} · 3^{2} · 5^{3} · 7	2	1^{1}11^{9}	11^{16}	Power equivalent
11B	11	4032000 = 2^{9} · 3^{2} · 5^{3} · 7	2	1^{1}11^{9}	11^{16}	Power equivalent
12A	12	3696000 = 2^{7} · 3 · 5^{3} · 7 · 11	2	2^{1},4^{2},6^{3},12^{6}	1,3^{5},4,12^{13}	
15A	15	2956800 = 2^{9} · 3 · 5^{2} · 7 · 11	1	5^{2},15^{6}	3^{2},5,15^{11}	
20A	20	2217600 = 2^{7} · 3^{2} · 5^{2} · 7 · 11	1	10^{2},20^{4}	1,5^{3},20^{8}	Power equivalent
20B	20	2217600 = 2^{7} · 3^{2} · 5^{2} · 7 · 11	1	10^{2},20^{4}	1,5^{3},20^{8}	Power equivalent

== Generalized Monstrous Moonshine ==
Conway and Norton suggested in their 1979 paper that monstrous moonshine is not limited to the monster group, but that similar phenomena may be found for other groups. Larissa Queen and others subsequently found that one can construct the expansions of many Hauptmoduln from simple combinations of dimensions of sporadic groups. For HS, the McKay-Thompson series is $T_{10A}(\tau)$ where one can set a(0) = 4 (OEIS: A058097),

$$\begin{align} j_{10A}(\tau) &= T_{10A}(\tau) + 4 \\
&= \left( \left( \frac{ \eta(\tau) \; \eta(5\tau) }{ \eta(2\tau) \; \eta(10\tau) } \right)^{2} + 2^2 \left( \frac{ \eta(2\tau) \; \eta(10\tau) }{ \eta(\tau) \; \eta(5\tau) } \right)^{2} \right)^2 \\
&= \left( \left( \frac{ \eta(\tau) \; \eta(2\tau) }{ \eta(5\tau) \; \eta(10\tau) } \right)     +  5  \left( \frac{ \eta(5\tau) \; \eta(10\tau) }{ \eta(\tau) \; \eta(2\tau) } \right)     \right)^2 - 4 \\
&= \frac{1}{q} + 4 + 22q + 56q^2 + 177q^3 + 352q^4 + 870q^5 + 1584q^6 + \cdots
\end{align}$$
