= 2-graph =

2-graph may refer to one of the following:

- Two-graph, a graph-like combinatorial structure
- 2-regular graph, in graph theory
