= J. H. van Lint =

Dutch mathematician (1932–2004)

Jack van Lint
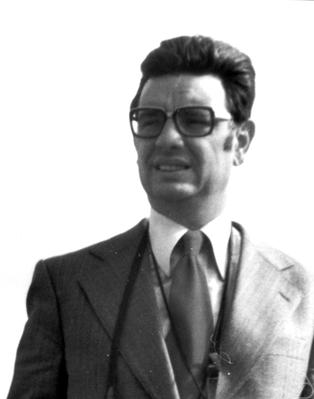
- Born: 1 September 1932; Bandung
- Died: 28 September 2004 (aged 72)
- Education: Utrecht University
- Known for: Berlekamp–Van Lint–Seidel graph
- Awards: Euler Medal (1996)
- Scientific career
- Fields: Mathematics
- Workplaces: Eindhoven University of Technology
- Doctoral advisor: Fred van der Blij

Jacobus Hendricus ("Jack") van Lint (1 September 1932 – 28 September 2004) was a Dutch mathematician, professor at the Eindhoven University of Technology, of which he was rector magnificus from 1991 till 1996.

He gained his Ph.D. from Utrecht University in 1957 under the supervision of Fred van der Blij. He was professor of mathematics at Eindhoven University of Technology from 1959 to 1997.

He was appointed a full professor at Eindhoven University of Technology at the age of 26 years. His field of research was initially number theory, but he worked mainly in combinatorics and coding theory.

Van Lint was honored with a great number of awards. He became a member of Royal Netherlands Academy of Arts and Sciences in 1972, received four honorary doctorates, was an honorary member of the Royal Netherlands Mathematics Society (Koninklijk Wiskundig Genootschap), and received a Knighthood.

== Books ==
- Coding Theory, 1971.
- Combinatorial Theory Seminar Eindhoven University of Technology, 1974
- Introduction to Coding Theory, Springer, Graduate Texts in Mathematics, 1982, 3rd. edition 1999.
- with Peter Cameron: Designs, Graphs, Codes and their Links, London Mathematical Society Lecture Notes, Cambridge University Press, 1980.
- with Richard M. Wilson: A Course in Combinatorics, Cambridge University Press, 1992. Van Lint, J. H.; Wilson, R. M. (2001). 2nd edition. Cambridge University Press. ISBN 978-1-139-43063-0.
- with Gerard van der Geer: Introduction to Coding theory and Algebraic Geometry, Birkhäuser, 1988.

== See also ==
- Seidel adjacency matrix
- Seidel switching
