= Equiangular lines =

In geometry, a set of lines is called equiangular if all the lines intersect at a single point, and every pair of lines makes the same angle.

== Equiangular lines in Euclidean space ==
Computing the maximum number of equiangular lines in n-dimensional Euclidean space is a difficult problem, and unsolved in general, though bounds are known. The maximal number of equiangular lines in 2-dimensional Euclidean space is 3: we can take the lines through opposite vertices of a regular hexagon, each at an angle 120 degrees from the other two. The maximum in 3 dimensions is 6: we can take lines through opposite vertices of an icosahedron. It is known that the maximum number in any dimension $n$ is less than or equal to $\binom{n+1}{2}$. The maximum in dimensions 1 through 16 is listed in the On-Line Encyclopedia of Integer Sequences as follows:

1, 3, 6, 6, 10, 16, 28, 28, 28, 28, 28, 28, 28, 28, 36, 40, ... (sequence A002853 in the OEIS).

In particular, the maximum number of equiangular lines in 7 dimensions is 28. We can obtain these lines as follows. Take the vector (−3,−3,1,1,1,1,1,1) in $\mathbb{R}^8$, and form all 28 vectors obtained by permuting its components. The dot product of two of these vectors equals 8 if both have a component of -3 in the same place, and it equals −8 otherwise. Thus, the lines through the origin containing these vectors are equiangular. Moreover, all 28 vectors are orthogonal to the vector (1,1,1,1,1,1,1,1) in $\mathbb{R}^8$, so they lie in a 7-dimensional space. In fact, these 28 vectors and their negatives are, up to rotation and dilatation, the 56 vertices of the 3_{21} polytope. In other words, they are the weight vectors of the 56-dimensional representation of the Lie group E_{7}.

Equiangular lines are equivalent to two-graphs. Given a set of equiangular lines, let c be the cosine of the common angle. We assume that the angle is not 90°, since that case is trivial (i.e., not interesting, because the lines are just coordinate axes); thus, c is nonzero. We may move the lines so they all pass through the origin of coordinates. Choose one unit vector in each line. Form the matrix M of inner products. This matrix has 1 on the diagonal and ±c everywhere else, and it is symmetric. Subtracting the identity matrix I and dividing by c, we have a symmetric matrix with zero diagonal and ±1 off the diagonal. This is the Seidel adjacency matrix of a two-graph. Conversely, every two-graph can be represented as a set of equiangular lines.

The problem of determining the maximum number of equiangular lines with a fixed angle in sufficiently high dimensions was solved by Jiang, Tidor, Yao, Zhang, and Zhao. The answer is expressed in spectral graph theoretic terms. Let $N_\alpha(d)$ denote the maximum number of lines through the origin in $d$ dimensions with common pairwise angle $\arccos\alpha$. Let $k$ denote the minimum number (if it exists) of vertices in a graph whose adjacency matrix has spectral radius exactly $(1-\alpha)/(2\alpha)$. If $k$ is finite, then $N_\alpha(d) = \lfloor k(d-1)/(k-1) \rfloor$ for all sufficiently large dimensions $d$ (here the "sufficiently large" may depend on $\alpha$). If no $k$ exists, then $N_\alpha(d) = d+ o(d)$.

== Equiangular lines in complex vector space ==
In a complex vector space equipped with an inner product, we can define the angle between unit vectors $\hat{a}$ and $\hat{b}$ by the relation $\cos(\theta)=|(\hat{a},\hat{b})|$. It is known that an upper bound for the number of complex equiangular lines in any dimension $n$ is $n^2$. Unlike the real case described above, it is possible that this bound is attained in every dimension $n$. The conjecture that this holds true was proposed by Zauner and verified analytically or numerically up to $n = 67$ by Scott and Grassl. A maximal set of complex equiangular lines is also known as a SIC or SIC-POVM.

== Notes ==
- J. J. Seidel "Discrete non-Euclidean geometry" In Buekenhout (ed.), Handbook of Incidence Geometry, Elsevier, Amsterdam, The Nederlands (1995) claims, without proof, that the maximum number of equiangular lines in dimension 14 is 28. This was not known at the time.
