= Mathieu group M22 =

Sporadic simple group

In the area of modern algebra known as group theory, the Mathieu group M_{22} is a sporadic simple group of order

443,520 = 2^{7} · 3^{2} · 5 · 7 · 11
≈ 4×10^{5}.

== History and properties ==
M_{22} is one of the 26 sporadic groups and was introduced by Mathieu (1861, 1873). It is a 3-fold transitive permutation group on 22 objects. The Schur multiplier of M_{22} is cyclic of order 12, and the outer automorphism group has order 2.

There are several incorrect statements about the 2-part of the Schur multiplier in the mathematical literature. Burgoyne & Fong (1966) incorrectly claimed that the Schur multiplier of M_{22} has order 3, and in a correction Burgoyne & Fong (1968) incorrectly claimed that it has order 6. This caused an error in the title of the paper Janko (1976) announcing the discovery of the Janko group J4. Mazet (1979) showed that the Schur multiplier is in fact cyclic of order 12.

Adem & Milgram (1995) calculated the 2-part of all the cohomology of M_{22}.

== Representations ==
M_{22} has a 3-transitive permutation representation on 22 points, with point stabilizer the group PSL_{3}(4), sometimes called M_{21}. This action fixes a Steiner system S(3,6,22) with 77 hexads, whose full automorphism group is the automorphism group M_{22}.2 of M_{22}.

M_{22} has three rank 3 permutation representations: one on the 77 hexads with point stabilizer 2^{4}:A_{6}, and two rank 3 actions on 176 heptads that are conjugate under an outer automorphism and have point stabilizer A_{7}.

M_{22} is the point stabilizer of the action of M_{23} on 23 points, and also the point stabilizer of the rank 3 action of the Higman–Sims group on 100 = 1+22+77 points.

The triple cover 3.M_{22} has a 6-dimensional faithful representation over the field with 4 elements.

The 6-fold cover of M_{22} appears in the centralizer 2^{1+12}.3.(M_{22}:2) of an involution of the Janko group J4.

== Maximal subgroups ==
There are no proper subgroups transitive on all 22 points. There are 8 conjugacy classes of maximal subgroups of M_{22} as follows:

Maximal subgroups of M_{22}
No.	Structure	Order	Index	Comments
1	M_{21} ≅ L_{3}(4)	20,160 = 2^{6}·3^{2}·5·7	22 = 2·11	one-point stabilizer
2	2^{4}:A_{6}	5,760 = 2^{7}·3^{2}·5	77 = 7·11	has orbits of sizes 6 and 16; stabilizer of W_{22} block
3,4	A_{7}	2,520 = 2^{3}·3^{2}·5·7	176 = 2^{4}·11	two classes, fused by an outer automorphism; has orbits of sizes 7 and 15; there are 2 sets, of 15 each, of simple subgroups of order 168. Those of one type have orbits of sizes 1, 7, and 14; the others have orbits of sizes 7, 8, and 7.
5	2^{4}:S_{5}	1,920 = 2^{7}·3·5	231 = 3·7·11	has orbits of sizes 2 and 20 (5 blocks of size 4); a 2-point stabilizer in the sextet group
6	2^{3}:L_{3}(2)	1,344 = 2^{6}·3·7	330 = 2·3·5·11	has orbits of sizes 8 and 14; centralizer of an outer automorphism of order 2 (class 2B)
7	M_{10} ≅ A_{6}^{·}2_{3}	720 = 2^{4}·3^{2}·5	616 = 2^{3}·7·11	has orbits of sizes 10 and 12 (2 blocks of size 6); a one-point stabilizer of M_{11} (point in orbit of 11)
8	L_{2}(11)	660 = 2^{2}·3·5·11	672 = 2^{5}·3·7	has two orbits of size 11; another one-point stabilizer of M_{11} (point in orbit of 12)

== Conjugacy classes ==
There are 12 conjugacy classes, though the two classes of elements of order 11 are fused under an outer automorphism.

Order	No. elements	Cycle structure	
1 = 1	1	1^{22}	
2 = 2	1155 = 3 · 5 · 7 · 11	1^{6}2^{8}	
3 = 3	12320 = 2^{5} · 5 · 7 · 11	1^{4}3^{6}	
4 = 2^{2}	13860 = 2^{2} · 3^{2} · 5 · 7 · 11	1^{2}2^{2}4^{4}	
4 = 2^{2}	27720 = 2^{3} · 3^{2} · 5 · 7 · 11	1^{2}2^{2}4^{4}	
5 = 5	88704 = 2^{7} · 3^{2} · 7 · 11	1^{2}5^{4}	
6 = 2 · 3	36960 = 2^{5} · 3 · 5 · 7 · 11	2^{2}3^{2}6^{2}	
7 = 7	63360= 2^{7} · 3^{2} · 5 · 11	1 7^{3}	Power equivalent
7 = 7	63360= 2^{7} · 3^{2} · 5 · 11	1 7^{3}	Power equivalent
8 = 2^{3}	55440 = 2^{4} · 3^{2} · 5 · 7 · 11	2·4·8^{2}	
11 = 11	40320 = 2^{7} · 3^{2} · 5 · 7	11^{2}	Power equivalent
11 = 11	40320 = 2^{7} · 3^{2} · 5 · 7	11^{2}	Power equivalent

== See also ==
- Cameron graph
- M_{22} graph
