= Fred van der Blij =

Dutch mathematician (1923–2018)

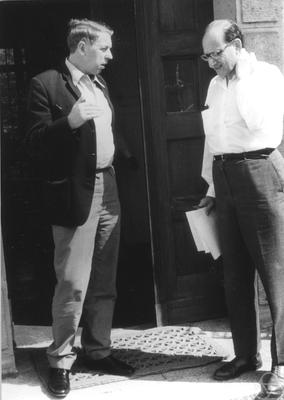
- Fred van der Blij (left) and Emil Grosswald in 1968.
- Born: 13 May 1923; Leiden, Netherlands
- Died: 27 January 2018 (aged 94); Heino, Netherlands
- Education: University of Leiden
- Scientific career
- Fields: Mathematics
- Workplaces: University of Utrecht
- Doctoral advisor: Hendrik Kloosterman
- Doctoral students: Jan Hogendijk; Jack van Lint

Frederik van der Blij (13 May 1923 – 27 January 2018) was a Dutch mathematician. From 1955 until his retirement in 1988 he was professor at the University of Utrecht. His research focused on number theory, among other fields.

== See also ==
- Van der Blij's lemma
