= Cameron graph =

Strongly regular graph

- Vertices: 231
- Edges: 3465
- Radius: 2
- Diameter: 2
- Girth: 3
- Automorphisms: 887040
- Properties: Strongly regular Symmetric graph

The Cameron graph is a strongly regular graph of parameters $(231, 30, 9, 3)$. This means that it has 231 vertices, 30 edges per vertex, 9 triangles per edges, and 3 two-edge paths between every two non-adjacent vertices.

It can be obtained from a Steiner system $S(3,6,22)$ (a collection of 22 elements and 6-element blocks with each triple of elements covered by exactly one block). In this construction, the 231 vertices of the graph correspond to the 231 unordered pairs of elements. Two vertices are adjacent whenever they come from two disjoint pairs whose union belongs to one of the blocks.

It is one of a small number of strongly regular graphs on which the Mathieu group M_{22} acts as symmetries taking every vertex to every other vertex. The smaller M_{22} graph is another.
