= Hoffman graph =

- The Hoffman graph
- Named after: Alan Hoffman
- Vertices: 16
- Edges: 32
- Radius: 3
- Diameter: 4
- Girth: 4
- Automorphisms: 48 (Z/2Z × S_{4})
- Chromatic number: 2
- Chromatic index: 4
- Book thickness: 3
- Queue number: 2
- Properties: Hamiltonian; Bipartite; Perfect; Eulerian; 1-walk regular

In the mathematical field of graph theory, the Hoffman graph is a 4-regular graph with 16 vertices and 32 edges discovered by Alan Hoffman. Published in 1963, it is cospectral to the hypercube graph Q_{4}.

The Hoffman graph has many common properties with the hypercube Q_{4}—both are Hamiltonian and have chromatic number 2, chromatic index 4, girth 4 and diameter 4. It is also a 4-vertex-connected graph and a 4-edge-connected graph. However, it is not distance-regular and not 1-planar. It has book thickness 3 and queue number 2.

== Algebraic properties ==
The Hoffman graph is not a vertex-transitive graph and its full automorphism group is a group of order 48 isomorphic to the direct product of the symmetric group S_{4} and the cyclic group Z/2Z. Despite not being vertex- or edge-transitive, the Hoffmann graph is still 1-walk-regular (but not distance-regular).

The characteristic polynomial of the Hoffman graph is equal to

$$(x-4) (x-2)^4 x^6 (x+2)^4 (x+4)$$

making it an integral graph—a graph whose spectrum consists entirely of integers. It is the same spectrum as the hypercube Q_{4}.

== Gallery ==
The Hoffman graph is Hamiltonian.

The chromatic number of the Hoffman graph is 2.

The chromatic index of the Hoffman graph is 4.
