= Hall–Janko graph =

- HJ as Foster graph (90 outer vertices) plus Steiner system S(3,4,10) (10 inner vertices).
- Named after: Zvonimir Janko; Marshall Hall
- Vertices: 100
- Edges: 1800
- Radius: 2
- Diameter: 2
- Girth: 3
- Automorphisms: 1209600
- Chromatic number: 10
- Properties: Strongly regular Vertex-transitive; Cayley graph Eulerian; Hamiltonian; Integral

In the mathematical field of graph theory, the Hall–Janko graph, also known as the Hall-Janko-Wales graph, is a 36-regular undirected graph with 100 vertices and 1800 edges.

It is a rank 3 strongly regular graph with parameters (100,36,14,12) and a maximum coclique of size 10. This parameter set is not unique, it is however uniquely determined by its parameters as a rank 3 graph. The Hall–Janko graph was originally constructed by D. Wales to establish the existence of the Hall-Janko group as an index 2 subgroup of its automorphism group.

The Hall–Janko graph can be constructed out of objects in U_{3}(3), the simple group of order 6048:

- In U_{3}(3) there are 36 simple maximal subgroups of order 168. These are the vertices of a subgraph, the U_{3}(3) graph. A 168-subgroup has 14 maximal subgroups of order 24, isomorphic to S_{4}. Two 168-subgroups are called adjacent when they intersect in a 24-subgroup. The U_{3}(3) graph is strongly regular, with parameters (36,14,4,6)
- There are 63 involutions (elements of order 2). A 168-subgroup contains 21 involutions, which are defined to be neighbors.
- Outside U_{3}(3) let there be a 100th vertex C, whose neighbors are the 36 168-subgroups. A 168-subgroup then has 14 common neighbors with C and in all 1+14+21 neighbors.
- An involution is found in 12 of the 168-subgroups. C and an involution are non-adjacent, with 12 common neighbors.
- Two involutions are defined as adjacent when they generate a dihedral subgroup of order 8. An involution has 24 involutions as neighbors.

The characteristic polynomial of the Hall–Janko graph is $(x-36)(x-6)^{36}(x+4)^{63}$. Therefore the Hall–Janko graph is an integral graph: its spectrum consists entirely of integers.
