= Isoclinism of groups =

Equivalence relation

In mathematics, specifically group theory, isoclinism is an equivalence relation on groups which generalizes isomorphism. Isoclinism was introduced by Hall (1940) to help classify and understand p-groups, although it is applicable to all groups. Isoclinism also has consequences for the Schur multiplier and the associated aspects of character theory, as described in Suzuki (1982, p. 256) and Conway et al. (1985, p. xxiii, Ch. 6.7). The word "isoclinism" comes from the Greek ισοκλινης meaning equal slope.

Some textbooks discussing isoclinism include Berkovich (2008, §29) and Blackburn, Neumann & Venkataraman (2007, §21.2) and Suzuki (1986, pp. 92–95).

== Definition ==
The isoclinism class of a group G is determined by the groups G/Z(G) (the inner automorphism group) and G′ (the commutator subgroup) and the commutator map from G/Z(G) × G/Z(G) to G′ (taking a, b to aba^{−1}b^{−1}).

In other words, two groups G_{1} and G_{2} are isoclinic if there are isomorphisms from G_{1}/Z(G_{1}) to G_{2}/Z(G_{2}) and from G_{1}′ to G_{2}′ commuting with the commutator map.

== Examples ==
All Abelian groups are isoclinic since they are equal to their centers and their commutator subgroups are always the identity subgroup. Indeed, a group is isoclinic to an abelian group if and only if it is itself abelian, and G is isoclinic with G×A if and only if A is abelian. The dihedral, quasidihedral, and quaternion groups of order 2^{n} are isoclinic for n≥3, Berkovich (2008, p. 285) in more detail.

Isoclinism divides p-groups into families, and the smallest members of each family are called stem groups. A group is a stem group if and only if Z(G) ≤ [G,G], that is, if and only if every element of the center of the group is contained in the derived subgroup (also called the commutator subgroup), Berkovich (2008, p. 287). Some enumeration results on isoclinism families are given in Blackburn, Neumann & Venkataraman (2007, p. 226).

Isoclinism is used in theory of projective representations of finite groups, as all Schur covering groups of a group are isoclinic, a fact already hinted at by Hall according to Suzuki (1982, p. 256). This is used in describing the character tables of the finite simple groups (Conway et al. 1985, p. xxiii, Ch. 6.7).
