= Fischer group =

In the area of modern algebra known as group theory, the Fischer groups are the three sporadic simple groups Fi_{22}, Fi_{23} and Fi_{24} introduced by Bernd Fischer (1971, 1976).

== 3-transposition groups ==
The Fischer groups are named after Bernd Fischer who discovered them while investigating 3-transposition groups. These are groups G with the following properties:

- G is generated by a conjugacy class of elements of order 2, called 'Fischer transpositions' or 3-transpositions.
- The product of any two distinct transpositions has order 2 or 3.

The typical example of a 3-transposition group is a symmetric group, where the Fischer transpositions are genuinely transpositions. The symmetric group S_{n} can be generated by n − 1 transpositions: (12), (23), ..., (n − 1, n).

Fischer was able to classify 3-transposition groups that satisfy certain extra technical conditions. The groups he found fell mostly into several infinite classes (besides symmetric groups: certain classes of symplectic, unitary, and orthogonal groups), but he also found 3 very large new groups. These groups are usually referred to as Fi_{22}, Fi_{23} and Fi_{24}. The first two of these are simple groups, and the third contains the simple group Fi_{24}′ of index 2.

A starting point for the Fischer groups is the unitary group PSU_{6}(2), which could be thought of as a group Fi_{21} in the series of Fischer groups, of order 9,196,830,720 = 2^{15}⋅3^{6}⋅5⋅7⋅11. Actually it is the double cover 2.PSU_{6}(2) that becomes a subgroup of the new group. This is the stabilizer of one vertex in a graph of 3510 (= 2⋅3^{3}⋅5⋅13). These vertices are identified as conjugate 3-transpositions in the symmetry group Fi_{22} of the graph.

The Fischer groups are named by analogy with the large Mathieu groups. In Fi_{22} a maximal set of 3-transpositions all commuting with one another has size 22 and is called a basic set. There are 1024 3-transpositions, called anabasic that do not commute with any in the particular basic set. Any one of other 2464, called hexadic, commutes with 6 basic ones. The sets of 6 form an S(3,6,22) Steiner system, whose symmetry group is M_{22}. A basic set generates an abelian group of order 2^{10}, which extends in Fi_{22} to a subgroup 2^{10}:M_{22}.

The next Fischer group comes by regarding 2.Fi_{22} as a one-point stabilizer for a graph of 31671 (= 3^{4}⋅17⋅23) vertices, and treating these vertices as the 3-transpositions in a group Fi_{23}. The 3-transpositions come in basic sets of 23, 7 of which commute with a given outside 3-transposition.

Next one takes Fi_{23} and treats it as a one-point stabilizer for a graph of 306936 (= 2^{3}⋅3^{3}⋅7^{2}⋅29) vertices to make a group Fi_{24}. The 3-transpositions come in basic sets of 24, eight of which commute with a given outside 3-transposition. The group Fi_{24} is not simple, but its derived subgroup has index 2 and is a sporadic simple group.

== Notation ==
There is no uniformly accepted notation for these groups. Some authors use F in place of Fi (F_{22}, for example). Fischer's notation for them was M(22), M(23) and M(24)′, which emphasised their close relationship with the three largest Mathieu groups, M_{22}, M_{23} and M_{24}.

One particular source of confusion is that Fi_{24} is sometimes used to refer to the simple group Fi_{24}′, and is sometimes used to refer to the full 3-transposition group (which is twice the size).

== Generalized Monstrous Moonshine ==
John H. Conway and Simon P. Norton suggested in their 1979 paper that monstrous moonshine is not limited to the monster, but that similar phenomena may be found for other groups. Larissa Queen and others subsequently found that one can construct the expansions of many Hauptmoduln (main or principal moduli) from simple combinations of dimensions of sporadic groups.
