= Seidel adjacency matrix =

Matrix in graph theory (mathematics)

In mathematics, in graph theory, the Seidel adjacency matrix of a simple undirected graph G is a symmetric matrix with a row and column for each vertex, having 0 on the diagonal, −1 for positions whose rows and columns correspond to adjacent vertices, and +1 for positions corresponding to non-adjacent vertices. It is also called the Seidel matrix or – its original name – the (−1,1,0)-adjacency matrix. It can be interpreted as the result of subtracting the adjacency matrix of G from the adjacency matrix of the complement of G.

The multiset of eigenvalues of this matrix is called the Seidel spectrum.

The Seidel matrix was introduced by J. H. van Lint and Johan Jacob Seidel in 1966 and extensively exploited by Seidel and coauthors.

The Seidel matrix of G is also the adjacency matrix of a signed complete graph K_{G} in which the edges of G are negative and the edges not in G are positive. It is also the adjacency matrix of the two-graph associated with G and K_{G}.

The eigenvalue properties of the Seidel matrix are valuable in the study of strongly regular graphs.
