= CH-quasigroup =

In mathematics, a CH-quasigroup, introduced by Manin (1986, definition 1.3), is a symmetric quasigroup in which any three elements generate an abelian quasigroup. "CH" stands for cubic hypersurface.
