= Null graph =

Order-zero graph or any edgeless graph

In the mathematical field of graph theory, the term "null graph" may refer either to the order-zero graph, or alternatively, to any edgeless graph (the latter is sometimes called an "empty graph").

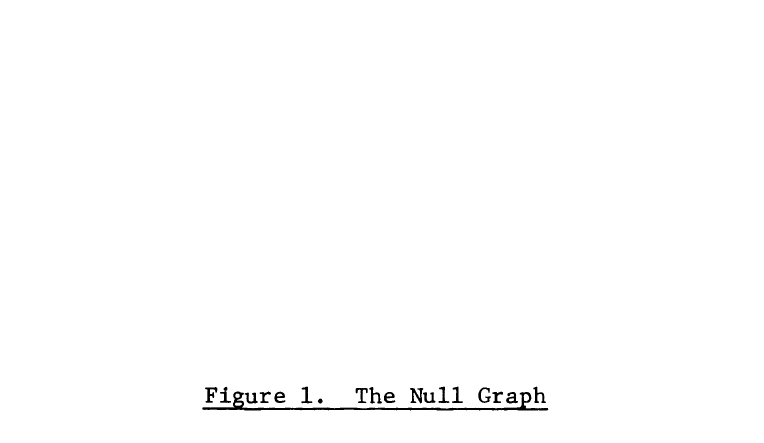

== Order-zero graph ==
Order-zero graph (null graph)
- Vertices: 0
- Edges: 0
- Girth: ∞
- Automorphisms: 1
- Chromatic number: 0
- Chromatic index: 0
- Genus: 0
- Properties: Integral; Symmetric; Treewidth -1
- Notation: K_{0}

The order-zero graph, K_{0}, is the unique graph having no vertices (hence its order is zero). It follows that K_{0} also has no edges. Thus the null graph is a regular graph of degree zero. Some authors exclude K_{0} from consideration as a graph (either by definition, or more simply as a matter of convenience). Whether including K_{0} as a valid graph is useful depends on context. On the positive side, K_{0} follows naturally from the usual set-theoretic definitions of a graph (it is the ordered pair (V, E) for which the vertex and edge sets, V and E, are both empty), in proofs it serves as a natural base case for mathematical induction, and similarly, in recursively defined data structures K_{0} is useful for defining the base case for recursion (by treating the null tree as the child of missing edges in any non-null binary tree, every non-null binary tree has exactly two children). On the negative side, including K_{0} as a graph requires that many well-defined formulas for graph properties include exceptions for it (for example, either "counting all strongly connected components of a graph" becomes "counting all non-null strongly connected components of a graph", or the definition of connected graphs has to be modified not to include K_{0}). To avoid the need for such exceptions, it is often assumed in literature that the term graph implies "graph with at least one vertex" unless context suggests otherwise.

In category theory, the order-zero graph is, according to some definitions of "category of graphs," the initial object in the category.

K_{0} does fulfill (vacuously) most of the same basic graph properties as does K_{1} (the graph with one vertex and no edges). As some examples, K_{0} is of size zero, it is equal to its complement graph K̅_{0}, a forest, and a planar graph. It may be considered undirected, directed, or even both; when considered as directed, it is a directed acyclic graph. And it is both a complete graph and an edgeless graph. However, definitions for each of these graph properties will vary depending on whether context allows for K_{0}.

== Edgeless graph ==
Edgeless graph (empty graph, null graph)
- Vertices: n
- Edges: 0
- Radius: 0
- Diameter: 0
- Girth: ∞
- Automorphisms: n!
- Chromatic number: 1
- Chromatic index: 0
- Genus: 0
- Properties: Integral; Symmetric
- Notation: K̅_{n}

For each natural number n, the edgeless graph (or empty graph) K̅_{n} of order n is the graph with n vertices and zero edges. An edgeless graph is occasionally referred to as a null graph in contexts where the order-zero graph is not permitted.

It is a 0-regular graph. The notation K̅_{n} arises from the fact that the n-vertex edgeless graph is the complement of the complete graph K_{n}.

== See also ==
- Glossary of graph theory
- Cycle graph
- Path graph
