= Charles Sims (mathematician) =

American mathematician (1937–2017)

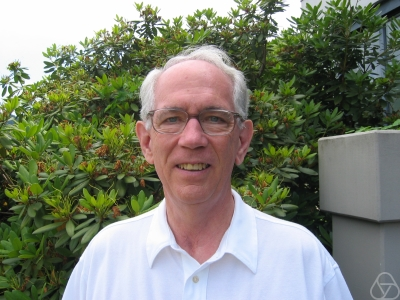
Charles C. Sims at Oberwolfach in 2006

Charles Coffin Sims (April 14, 1937 – October 23, 2017) was an American mathematician best known for his work in group theory. Together with Donald G. Higman he discovered the Higman–Sims group, one of the sporadic groups. The permutation group software developed by Sims also led to the proof of existence of the Lyons group (also known as the Lyons–Sims group) and the O'Nan group (also known as the O'Nan–Sims group).

Sims was born and raised in Elkhart, Indiana, and received his B.S. from the University of Michigan. He did his graduate studies at Harvard University, where he was a student of John G. Thompson and received his Ph.D. degree in 1963. In his thesis, he enumerated p-groups, giving sharp asymptotic upper and lower bounds. Sims is one of the founders of computational group theory and is the eponym of the Schreier–Sims algorithm. He was a faculty member at the Department of Mathematics at Rutgers University from 1965 to 2007. During that period he served, in particular, as Department Chair (1982–84) and Associate Provost for Computer Planning (1984–87). Sims retired from Rutgers in 2007 and moved to St. Petersburg, Florida.

In 2012, he became a fellow of the American Mathematical Society.

== See also ==
- Higman–Sims graph
- Prevalence of p-groups
- Sims conjecture
