= 3-transposition group =

Type of mathematical group

In mathematical group theory, a 3-transposition group is a group generated by a conjugacy class of involutions, called the 3-transpositions, such that the product of any two involutions from the conjugacy class has order at most 3.

They were first studied by Bernd Fischer (1964, 1970, 1971) who discovered the three Fischer groups as examples of 3-transposition groups.

== History ==
Fischer (1964) first studied 3-transposition groups in the special case when the product of any two distinct 3-transpositions has order 3. He showed that a finite group with this property is solvable, and has a (nilpotent) 3-group of index 2. Manin (1986) used these groups to construct examples of non-abelian CH-quasigroups and to describe the structure of commutative Moufang loops of exponent 3.

== Fischer's theorem ==
Suppose that G is a group that is generated by a conjugacy class D of 3-transpositions and such that the 2 and 3 cores O_{2}(G) and O_{3}(G) are both contained in the center Z(G) of G. Then Fischer (1971) proved that up to isomorphism G/Z(G) is one of the following groups and D is the image of the given conjugacy class:

- G/Z(G) is the trivial group.
- G/Z(G) is a symmetric group S_{n} for n≥5, and D is the class of transpositions. (If n=6 there is a second class of 3-transpositions).
- G/Z(G) is a symplectic group Sp_{2n}(2) with n≥3 over the field of order 2, and D is the class of transvections. (When n=2 there is a second class of transpositions.)
- G/Z(G) is a projective special unitary group PSU_{n}(2) with n≥5, and D is the class of transvections
- G/Z(G) is an orthogonal group O^{μ}_{2n}(2) with μ=±1 and n≥4, and D is the class of transvections
- G/Z(G) is an index 2 subgroup PO_{n}^{μ,+}(3) of the projective orthogonal group PO_{n}^{μ}(3) (with μ=±1 and n≥5) generated by the class D of reflections of norm +1 vectors.
- G/Z(G) is one of the three Fischer groups Fi_{22}, Fi_{23}, Fi_{24}.
- G/Z(G) is one of two groups of the form Ω_{8}^{+}(2).S_{3} and PΩ_{8}^{+}(3).S_{3}, where Ω stands for the derived subgroup of the orthogonal group and S_{3} is the group of diagram automorphisms for the D_{4} Dynkin diagram.

The missing cases with n small above either do not satisfy the condition about 2 and 3 cores or have exceptional isomorphisms to other groups on the list.

== Important examples ==
The group S_{n} has order n! and for n>1 has a subgroup A_{n} of index 2 that is simple if n>4.

The symmetric group S_{n} is a 3-transposition group for all n>1. The 3-transpositions are the elements that exchange two points, and leaving each of the remaining points fixed. These elements are the transpositions (in the usual sense) of S_{n}. (For n=6 there is a second class of 3-transpositions, namely the class of the elements of S_{6} which are products of 3 disjoint transpositions.)

The symplectic group Sp_{2n}(2) has order

$$2^{n^2}(2^2-1)(2^4-1)\cdots (2^{2n}-1)$$

It is a 3-transposition group for all n≥1. It is simple if n>2, while for n=1 it is S_{3}, and for n=2 it is S_{6} with a simple subgroup of index 2, namely A_{6}. The 3-transpositions are of the form x↦x+(x,v)v for non-zero v.

The special unitary group SU_{n}(2) has order

$$2^{n(n-1)/2}(2^2-1)(2^3+1)\cdots (2^n-(-1)^n)$$

The projective special unitary group PSU_{n}(2) is the quotient of the special unitary group SU_{n}(2) by the subgroup M of all the scalar linear transformations in SU_{n}(2). The subgroup M is the center of SU_{n}(2). Also, M has order gcd(3,n).

The group PSU_{n}(2) is simple if n>3, while for n=2 it is S_{3} and for n=3 it has the structure 3^{2}:Q_{8} (Q_{8} = quaternion group).

Both SU_{n}(2) and PSU_{n}(2) are 3-transposition groups for n=2 and for all n≥4. The 3-transpositions of SU_{n}(2) for n=2 or n≥4 are of the form x↦x+(x,v)v for non-zero vectors v of zero norm. The 3-transpositions of PSU_{n}(2) for n=2 or n≥4 are the images of the 3-transpositions of SU_{n}(2) under the natural quotient map from SU_{n}(2) to PSU_{n}(2)=SU_{n}(2)/M.

The orthogonal group O_{2n}^{±}(2) has order

$$2\times 2^{n(n-1)}(2^2-1)(2^4-1)\cdots (2^{2n-2}-1)(2^{n}\mp1)$$

(Over fields of characteristic 2, orthogonal group in odd dimensions are isomorphic to symplectic groups.) It has an index 2 subgroup (sometimes denoted by Ω_{2n}^{±}(2)), which is simple if n>2.

The group O_{2n}^{μ}(2) is a 3-transposition group for all n>2 and μ=±1. The 3-transpositions are of the form x↦x+(x,v)v for vectors v such that Q(v)=1, where Q is the underlying quadratic form for the orthogonal group.

The orthogonal groups O_{n}^{±}(3) are the automorphism groups of quadratic forms Q over the field of 3 elements such that the discriminant of the bilinear form (a,b)=Q(a+b)−Q(a)−Q(b) is ±1. The group O_{n}^{μ,σ}(3), where μ and σ are signs, is the subgroup of O_{n}^{μ}(3) generated by reflections with respect to vectors v with Q(v)=+1 if σ is +, and is the subgroup of O_{n}^{μ}(3) generated by reflections with respect to vectors v with Q(v)=-1 if σ is −.

For μ=±1 and σ=±1, let PO_{n}^{μ,σ}(3)=O_{n}^{μ,σ}(3)/Z, where Z is the group of all scalar linear transformations in O_{n}^{μ,σ}(3). If n>3, then Z is the center of O_{n}^{μ,σ}(3).

For μ=±1, let Ω_{n}^{μ}(3) be the derived subgroup of O_{n}^{μ}(3). Let PΩ_{n}^{μ}(3)= Ω_{n}^{μ}(3)/X, where X is the group of all scalar linear transformations in Ω_{n}^{μ}(3). If n>2, then X is the center of Ω_{n}^{μ}(3).

If n=2m+1 is odd the two orthogonal groups O_{n}^{±}(3) are isomorphic and have order

$$2\times 3^{m^2}(3^2-1)(3^4-1)\cdots(3^{2m}-1)$$

and O_{n}^{+,+}(3) ≅ O_{n}^{−,−}(3) (center order 1 for n>3), and O_{n}^{−,+}(3) ≅ O_{n}^{+,−}(3) (center order 2 for n>3), because the two quadratic forms are scalar multiples of each other, up to linear equivalence.

If n=2m is even the two orthogonal groups O_{n}^{±}(3) have orders

$$2\times 3^{m(m-1)}(3^2-1)(3^4-1)\cdots(3^{2m-2}-1)(3^m\mp 1)$$

and O_{n}^{+,+}(3) ≅ O_{n}^{+,−}(3), and O_{n}^{−,+}(3) ≅ O_{n}^{−,−}(3), because the two classes of transpositions are exchanged by an element of the general orthogonal group that multiplies the quadratic form by a scalar. If n=2m, m>1 and m is even, then the centre of O_{n}^{+,+}(3) ≅ O_{n}^{+,−}(3) has order 2, and the centre of O_{n}^{−,+}(3) ≅ O_{n}^{−,−}(3) has order 1. If n=2m, m>2 and m is odd, then the centre of O_{n}^{+,+}(3) ≅ O_{n}^{+,−}(3) has order 1, and the centre of O_{n}^{−,+}(3) ≅ O_{n}^{−,−}(3) has order 2.

If n>3, and μ=±1 and σ=±1, the group O_{n}^{μ,σ}(3) is a 3-transposition group. The 3-transpositions of the group O_{n}^{μ,σ}(3) are of the form x↦x−(x,v)v/Q(v)=x+(x, v)/(v,v) for vectors v with Q(v)=σ, where Q is the underlying quadratic form of O_{n}^{μ}(3).

If n>4, and μ=±1 and σ=±1, then O_{n}^{μ,σ}(3) has index 2 in the orthogonal group O_{n}^{μ}(3). The group O_{n}^{μ,σ}(3) has a subgroup of index 2, namely Ω_{n}^{μ}(3), which is simple modulo their centers (which have orders 1 or 2). In other words, PΩ_{n}^{μ}(3) is simple.

If n>4 is odd, and (μ,σ)=(+,+) or (−,−), then O_{n}^{μ,+}(3) and PO_{n}^{μ,+}(3) are both isomorphic to SO_{n}^{μ}(3)=Ω_{n}^{μ}(3):2, where SO_{n}^{μ}(3) is the special orthogonal group of the underlying quadratic form Q. Also, Ω_{n}^{μ}(3) is isomorphic to PΩ_{n}^{μ}(3), and is also non-abelian and simple.

If n>4 is odd, and (μ,σ)=(+,−) or (−,+), then O_{n}^{μ,+}(3) is isomorphic to Ω_{n}^{μ}(3)×2, and O_{n}^{μ,+}(3) is isomorphic to Ω_{n}^{μ}(3). Also, Ω_{n}^{μ}(3) is isomorphic to PΩ_{n}^{μ}(3), and is also non-abelian and simple.

If n>5 is even, and μ=±1 and σ=±1, then O_{n}^{μ,+}(3) has the form Ω_{n}^{μ}(3):2, and PO_{n}^{μ,+}(3) has the form PΩ_{n}^{μ}(3):2. Also, PΩ_{n}^{μ}(3) is non-abelian and simple.

Fi_{22} has order 2^{17}.3^{9}.5^{2}.7.11.13 = 64561751654400 and is simple.

Fi_{23} has order 2^{18}.3^{13}.5^{2}.7.11.13.17.23 = 4089470473293004800 and is simple.

Fi_{24} has order 2^{22}.3^{16}.5^{2}.7^{3}.11.13.17.23.29 and has a simple subgroup of index 2, namely Fi_{24}'.

== Isomorphisms and solvable cases ==
There are numerous degenerate (solvable) cases and isomorphisms between 3-transposition groups of small degree as follows (Aschbacher 1997, p.46):

=== Solvable groups ===
The following groups do not appear in the conclusion of Fisher's theorem as they are solvable (with order a power of 2 times a power of 3).

$S_1=SU_1(2)=PSU_1(2)=O_1^{\pm,\pm}(3)=PO_1^{\pm,\pm}(3)=PO_1^{\pm,\mp}(3)$ has order 1.
$S_2=O_2^+(2)=O_1^{\pm,\mp}(3)=O_2^{+,\pm}(3)=PO_2^{+,\pm}(3)=PO_2^{-,\pm}(3)$ has order 2, and it is a 3-transposition group.
$O_2^{-,\pm}(3)=PO_3^{\pm,\mp}(3)=2^2$ is elementary abelian of order 4, and it is not a 3-transposition group.
$S_3=Sp_2(2)=SU_2(2)=PSU_2(2)=O_2^-(2)$ has order 6, and it is a 3-transposition group.
$O_3^{\pm,\mp}(3)=2^3$ is elementary abelian of order 8, and it is not a 3-transposition group.
$S_4=O_3^{\pm,\pm}(3)=PO_3^{\pm,\pm}(3)$ has order 24, and it is a 3-transposition group.
$PSU_3(2)=3^2:Q_8$ has order 72, and it is not a 3-transposition group, where Q_{8} denotes the quaternion group.
$O_4^+(2)=(S_3\times S_3):2$ has order 72, and it is not a 3-transposition group.
$SU_3(2)=3^{1+2}:Q_8$ has order 216, and it is not a 3-transposition group, where 3^{1+2} denotes the extraspecial group of order 27 and exponent 3, and Q_{8} denotes the quaternion group.
$PO_4^{+,\pm}(3)=(A_4\times A_4):2$ has order 288, and it is not a 3-transposition group.
$O_4^{+,\pm}(3)=(SL_2(3)*SL_2(3)):2$ has order 576, where * denotes the non-direct central product, and it is not a 3-transposition group.

=== Isomorphisms ===
There are several further isomorphisms involving groups in the conclusion of Fischer's theorem as follows. This list also identifies the Weyl groups of ADE Dynkin diagrams, which are all 3-transposition groups except W(D_{2})=2^{2}, with groups on Fischer's list (W stands for Weyl group).

$S_5=O_4^-(2)$ has order 120, and the group is a 3-transposition group.
$S_6=Sp_4(2)=O_4^{-,\pm}(3) = PO_4^{-,\pm}(3)$ has order 720 (and 2 classes of 3-transpositions), and the group is a 3-transposition group.
$S_8=O_6^+(2)=$ has order 40320, and the group is a 3-transposition group.
$W(E_6)=O_6^-(2)=O_5^{\pm,\pm}(3)=PO_5^{\pm,\pm}(3)$ has order 51840, and the group is a 3-transposition group.
$PO_5^{\pm,\mp}(3)=SU_4(2)=PSU_4(2)$ has order 25920, and the group is a 3-transposition group.
$W(E_7)=2\times Sp_6(2)$ has order 2903040, and the group is a 3-transposition group.
$W(E_8)=2.O_8^+(2)$ has order 69672960, and the group is a 3-transposition group.
$O_{4s}^{+,+}(3)=O_{4s}^{+,-}(3)=2.PO_{4s}^{+,+}(3)=2.PO_{4s}^{+,-}(3)$ for all s≥1, and the group is a 3-transposition group if s≥2.
$O_{4s}^{-,+}(3)=O_{4s}^{-,-}(3)=PO_{4s}^{-,+}(3)=PO_{4s}^{-,-}(3)$ for all s≥1, and the group is a 3-transposition group for all s≥1.
$O_{4s+2}^{+,+}(3)=O_{4s+2}^{+,-}(3)=2.PO_{4s+2}^{+,+}(3)=2.PO_{4s+2}^{+,-}(3)$ for all s≥0, and the group is a 3-transposition group for all s≥0.
$O_{4s+2}^{-,+}(3)=O_{4s+2}^{-,-}(3)=PO_{4s+2}^{-,+}(3)=PO_{4s+2}^{-,-}(3)$ for all s≥0, and the group is a 3-transposition group if s≥1.
$O_{2m+1}^{+,+}(3)=O_{2m+1}^{-,-}(3)=PO_{2m+1}^{+,+}(3)=PO_{2m+1}^{-,-}(3)$ for all m≥0, and the group is a 3-transposition group if m≥1.
$O_{2m+1}^{-,+}(3)=O_{2m+1}^{+,-}(3)=2\times PO_{2m+1}^{-,+}(3)=2\times PO_{2m+1}^{+,-}(3)$ for all m≥0, and the group is a 3-transposition group if m=0 or m≥2.
$W(A_n)=S_{n+1}$ for all n≥1, and the group is a 3-transposition group for all n≥1.
$W(D_n)=2^{n-1}.S_n$ for all n≥2, and the group is a 3-transposition group if n≥3.

== Proof ==
The idea of the proof is as follows. Suppose that D is the class of 3-transpositions in G, and d∈D, and let H be the subgroup generated by the set D_{d} of elements of D commuting with d. Then D_{d} is a set of 3-transpositions of H, so the 3-transposition groups can be classified by induction on the order by finding all possibilities for G given any 3-transposition group H. For simplicity assume that the derived group of G is perfect (this condition is satisfied by all but the two groups involving triality automorphisms.)

- If O_{3}(H) is not contained in Z(H) then G is the symmetric group S_{5}
- If O_{2}(H) is not contained in Z(H) then L=H/O_{2}(H) is a 3-transposition group, and L/Z(L) is either of type Sp(2n, 2) in which case G/Z(G) is of type Sp_{2n+2}(2), or of type PSU_{n}(2) in which case G/Z(G) is of type PSU_{n+2}(2)
- If H/Z(H) is of type S_{n} then either G is of type S_{n+2} or n = 6 and G is of type O_{6}^{−}(2)
- If H/Z(H) is of type Sp_{2n}(2) with 2n ≥ 6 then G is of type O_{2n+2}^{μ}(2)
- H/Z(H) cannot be of type O_{2n}^{μ}(2) for n ≥ 4.
- If H/Z(H) is of type PO_{n}^{μ, π}(3) for n>4 then G is of type PO_{n+1}^{−μπ, π}(3).
- If H/Z(H) is of type PSU_{n}(2) for n ≥ 5 then n = 6 and G is of type Fi_{22} (and H is an exceptional double cover of PSU_{6}(2))
- If H/Z(H) is of type Fi_{22} then G is of type Fi_{23} and H is a double cover of Fi_{22}.
- If H/Z(H) is of type Fi_{23} then G is of type Fi_{24} and H is the product of Fi_{23} and a group of order 2.
- H/Z(H) cannot be of type Fi_{24}.

== 3-transpositions and graph theory ==
It is fruitful to treat 3-transpositions as vertices of a graph. Join the pairs that do not commute, i. e. have a product of order 3. The graph is connected unless the group has a direct product decomposition. The graphs corresponding to the smallest symmetric groups are familiar graphs. The 3 transpositions of S_{3} form a triangle. The 6 transpositions of S_{4} form an octahedron. The 10 transpositions of S_{5} form the complement of the Petersen graph.

The symmetric group S_{n} can be generated by n–1 transpositions: (1 2), (2 3), ..., (n−1 n) and the graph of this generating set is a straight line. It embodies sufficient relations to define the group S_{n}.
