= Donald G. Higman =

American mathematician

Donald G. Higman (September 20, 1928 in Vancouver – February 13, 2006) was an American mathematician known for his discovery, in collaboration with Charles C. Sims, of the Higman–Sims group.

Higman did his undergraduate studies at the University of British Columbia, and received his Ph.D. in 1952 from the University of Illinois Urbana-Champaign under Reinhold Baer. He served on the faculty of mathematics at the University of Michigan from 1956 to 1998.

His work on homological aspects of group representation theory established the concept of a relatively-projective module and explained its role in the theory of module decompositions. He developed a characterization of rank-2 permutation groups, and a theory of rank-3 permutation groups; several of the later-discovered sporadic simple groups were of this type, including the Higman–Sims group which he and Sims constructed in 1967.
