= Walk-regular graph =

Mathematical Graph

In graph theory, a walk-regular graph is a simple graph where the number of closed walks of any length $\ell$ from a vertex to itself does only depend on $\ell$ but not depend on the choice of vertex. Walk-regular graphs can be thought of as a spectral graph theory analogue of vertex-transitive graphs. While a walk-regular graph is not necessarily very symmetric, all its vertices still behave identically with respect to the graph's spectral properties.

== Equivalent definitions ==
Suppose that $G$ is a simple graph. Let $A$ denote the adjacency matrix of $G$, $V(G)$ denote the set of vertices of $G$, and $\Phi_{G - v}(x)$ denote the characteristic polynomial of the vertex-deleted subgraph $G - v$ for all $v \in V(G).$Then the following are equivalent:

- $G$ is walk-regular.
- $A^k$ is a constant-diagonal matrix for all $k \geq 0.$
- $\Phi_{G - u}(x) = \Phi_{G - v}(x)$ for all $u, v \in V(G).$

== Examples ==
- The vertex-transitive graphs are walk-regular.
- The distance-regular graphs are walk-regular. More generally, any simple graph in a homogeneous coherent algebra is walk-regular.
- A connected regular graph is walk-regular if it has at most four distinct eigenvalues.

== Properties ==
- A walk-regular graph is necessarily a regular graph, since the number of closed walks of length two starting at any vertex is twice the vertex's degree.
- Complements of walk-regular graphs are walk-regular.
- Cartesian products of walk-regular graphs are walk-regular.
- Categorical products of walk-regular graphs are walk-regular.
- Strong products of walk-regular graphs are walk-regular.
- In general, the line graph of a walk-regular graph is not walk-regular.

== k-walk-regular graphs ==
A graph is $k$-walk-regular if for any two vertices $v$ and $w$ of distance at most $k,$ the number of walks of length $\ell$ from $v$ to $w$ depends only on $k$ and $\ell$.

The class of $0$-walk-regular graphs is exactly the class of walk-regular graphs

In analogy to walk-regular graphs generalizing vertex-transitive graphs, 1-walk-regular graphs can be thought of as generalizing symmetric graphs, that is, graphs that are both vertex- and edge-transitive. For example, the Hoffman graph is 1-walk-regular but not symmetric.

If $k$ is at least the diameter of the graph, then the $k$-walk-regular graphs coincide with the distance-regular graphs. In fact, if $k\ge 2$ and the graph has an eigenvalue of multiplicity at most $k$ (except for eigenvalues $d$ and $-d$, where $d$ is the degree of the graph), then the graph is already distance-regular.
