= Bernd Fischer (mathematician) =

German mathematician (1936–2020)

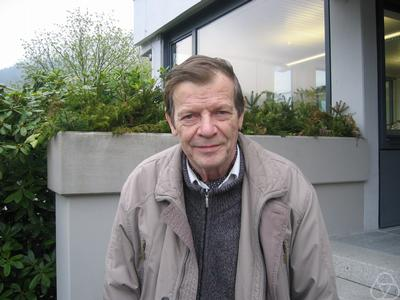
- Bernd Fischer at the Mathematical Research Institute of Oberwolfach, 2008
- Born: 18 December 1936; Endbach, Hesse-Nassau
- Died: 13 August 2020 (aged 83); Werther, North Rhine-Westphalia
- Education: Goethe University Frankfurt
- Scientific career
- Fields: Mathematics
- Thesis: Distribute Quasigruppen endlicher Ordnung (1963)
- Doctoral advisor: Reinhold Baer

Bernd Fischer (18 December 1936 – 13 August 2020) was a German mathematician.

He is best known for his contributions to the classification of finite simple groups, and discovered several of the sporadic groups. He introduced 3-transposition groups and constructed the three Fischer groups, predicted the existence of the baby monster and monster groups, and described and computed the character table of the baby monster.

He did his PhD in 1963 at the Johann Wolfgang Goethe University of Frankfurt am Main under the direction of Reinhold Baer.

== Career ==
Fischer went to Goethe University in Frankfurt to study mathematics under Baer in the early 60s, receiving his PhD in 1963. He later moved to the Bielefeld University, where he became head of mathematical sciences.

In 1970, he classified the almost-simple groups generated by 3-transpositions. In the process, he discovered three new sporadic groups, which were later called the Fischer groups. His proof that the classification was complete was known but not published in a single narrative until Aschbacher published an elementary introduction of 3-transposition groups in 1996.

By loosening some of the conditions on his classification, in 1973 he predicted the existence of two larger sporadic simple groups: a {3,4}-transposition group, now known as the baby monster group, and a {3,4,5,6}-transposition group now known as the monster group or the Fischer-Griess Monster. These would turn out to be the two largest sporadic groups that could exist. Robert Griess independently discovered the Monster group and published a description in 1976.

Fischer went on to compute the character table for both monsters, in collaboration with Donald Livingstone and Michael Thorne. Leon and Sims first produced a construction of the baby monster in 1977, and Griess produced one for the monster in 1980.

== Personal life ==
Fischer was raised in Bad Endbach. He later moved to North Rhine-Westphalia, where he died in August, 2020.
