= Schur multiplier =

Second homology group of a group

In mathematical group theory, the Schur multiplier or Schur multiplicator is the second homology group $H_2(G, \Z)$ of a group G. It was introduced by Issai Schur (1904) in his work on projective representations.

== Examples and properties ==
The Schur multiplier $\operatorname{M}(G)$ of a finite group G is a finite abelian group whose exponent divides the order of G. If a Sylow p-subgroup of G is cyclic for some p, then the order of $\operatorname{M}(G)$ is not divisible by p. In particular, if all Sylow p-subgroups of G are cyclic, then $\operatorname{M}(G)$ is trivial.

For instance, the Schur multiplier of the nonabelian group of order 6 is the trivial group since every Sylow subgroup is cyclic. The Schur multiplier of the elementary abelian group of order 16 is an elementary abelian group of order 64, showing that the multiplier can be strictly larger than the group itself. The Schur multiplier of the quaternion group is trivial, but the Schur multiplier of dihedral 2-groups has order 2.

The Schur multipliers of the finite simple groups are given at the list of finite simple groups. The covering groups of the alternating and symmetric groups are of considerable recent interest.

== Relation to projective representations ==
A projective representation of G can be pulled back to a linear representation of a central extension C of G.

Schur's original motivation for studying the multiplier was to classify projective representations of a group, and the modern formulation of his definition is the second cohomology group $H^2(G, \Complex^{\times})$. A projective representation is much like a group representation except that instead of a homomorphism into the general linear group $\operatorname{GL}(n, \Complex)$, one takes a homomorphism into the projective general linear group $\operatorname{PGL}(n, \Complex)$. In other words, a projective representation is a representation modulo the center.

Schur (1904, 1907) showed that every finite group G has associated to it at least one finite group C, called a Schur cover, with the property that every projective representation of G can be lifted to an ordinary representation of C. The Schur cover is also known as a covering group or Darstellungsgruppe. The Schur covers of the finite simple groups are known, and each is an example of a quasisimple group. The Schur cover of a perfect group is uniquely determined up to isomorphism, but the Schur cover of a general finite group is only determined up to isoclinism.

== Relation to central extensions ==
The study of such covering groups led naturally to the study of central and stem extensions.

A central extension of a group G is an extension

$$1 \to K\to C\to G\to 1$$

where $K\le Z(C)$ is a subgroup of the center of C.

A stem extension of a group G is an extension

$$1 \to K\to C\to G\to 1$$

where $K\le Z(C)\cap C'$ is a subgroup of the intersection of the center of C and the derived subgroup of C; this is more restrictive than central.

If the group G is finite and one considers only stem extensions, then there is a largest size for such a group C, and for every C of that size the subgroup K is isomorphic to the Schur multiplier of G. If the finite group G is moreover perfect, then C is unique up to isomorphism and is itself perfect. Such a C is often called the universal perfect central extension of G, or covering group (as it is a discrete analog of the universal covering space in topology). If the finite group G is not perfect, then its Schur covering groups (all such C of maximal order) are only isoclinic.

It is also called more briefly a universal central extension, but note that there is no largest central extension, as the direct product of G and an abelian group form a central extension of G of arbitrary size.

Stem extensions have the nice property that any lift of a generating set of G is a generating set of C. If the group G is presented in terms of a free group F on a set of generators, and a normal subgroup R generated by a set of relations on the generators, so that $G \cong F/R$, then the covering group itself can be presented in terms of F but with a smaller normal subgroup S, that is, $C\cong F/S$. Since the relations of G specify elements of K when considered as part of C, one must have $S \le [F,R]$.

In fact if G is perfect, this is all that is needed: C ≅ [F,F]/[F,R] and M(G) ≅ K ≅ R/[F,R]. Because of this simplicity, expositions such as (Aschbacher 2000, §33) handle the perfect case first. The general case for the Schur multiplier is similar but ensures the extension is a stem extension by restricting to the derived subgroup of F: M(G) ≅ (R ∩ [F, F])/[F, R]. These are all slightly later results of Schur, who also gave a number of useful criteria for calculating them more explicitly.

== Relation to efficient presentations ==
In combinatorial group theory, a group often originates from a presentation. One important theme in this area of mathematics is to study presentations with as few relations as possible, such as one relator groups like Baumslag–Solitar groups. These groups are infinite groups with two generators and one relation, and an old result of Schreier shows that in any presentation with more generators than relations, the resulting group is infinite. The borderline case is thus quite interesting: finite groups with the same number of generators as relations are said to have a deficiency zero. For a group to have deficiency zero, the group must have a trivial Schur multiplier because the minimum number of generators of the Schur multiplier is always less than or equal to the difference between the number of relations and the number of generators, which is the negative deficiency. An efficient group is one where the Schur multiplier requires this number of generators.

A fairly recent topic of research is to find efficient presentations for all finite simple groups with trivial Schur multipliers. Such presentations are in some sense nice because they are usually short, but they are difficult to find and to work with because they are ill-suited to standard methods such as coset enumeration.

== Relation to topology ==
In topology, groups can often be described as finitely presented groups and a fundamental question is to calculate their integral homology $H_n(G, \Z)$. In particular, the second homology plays a special role and this led Heinz Hopf to find an effective method for calculating it. The method in (Hopf 1942) is also known as Hopf's integral homology formula and is identical to Schur's formula for the Schur multiplier of a finite group:

$$H_2(G, \Z) \cong (R \cap [F, F])/[F, R]$$

where $G \cong F/R$ and F is a free group. The same formula also holds when G is a perfect group.

The recognition that these formulas were the same led Samuel Eilenberg and Saunders Mac Lane to the creation of cohomology of groups. In general,

$$H_2(G, \Z) \cong  \bigl( H^2(G, \Complex^{\times}) \bigr)^*$$

where the star denotes the algebraic dual group. Moreover, when G is finite, there is an unnatural isomorphism

$$\bigl( H^2(G, \Complex^{\times}) \bigr)^* \cong H^2(G, \Complex^{\times}).$$

The Hopf formula for $H_2(G)$ has been generalised to higher dimensions. For one approach and references see the paper by Everaert, Gran and Van der Linden listed below.

A perfect group is one whose first integral homology vanishes. A superperfect group is one whose first two integral homology groups vanish. The Schur covers of finite perfect groups are superperfect. An acyclic group is a group all of whose reduced integral homology vanishes.

== Applications ==
The second algebraic K-group K_{2}(R) of a commutative ring R can be identified with the second homology group H_{2}(E(R), Z) of the group E(R) of (infinite) elementary matrices with entries in R.

== See also ==
- Quasisimple group

The references from Clair Miller give another view of the Schur Multiplier as the kernel of a morphism κ: G ∧ G → G induced by the commutator map.
