= Finite subgroups of SU(2) =

Double covers of the finite rotation groups

The character tables of the binary tetrahedral, octahedral and icosahedral groups following Frobenius (1899)

In mathematics, the finite subgroups of the special unitary group SU(2), or equivalently of the group of unit quaternions, are the cyclic groups and the binary polyhedral groups. The latter are the preimages of the finite rotation groups under the two-to-one homomorphism from SU(2) onto the rotation group SO(3); their structure and classification are described in that article. The present article treats their representations and character tables, which were determined by Georg Frobenius in 1899.

In physics and chemistry, the preimage Γ′ of a finite rotation group Γ is known as a double group (Doppelgruppe), a term introduced by Hans Bethe. Double groups are needed because the wavefunction of a particle with half-integer spin changes sign under a rotation by 360°, so that this rotation corresponds to an element of the double group that is distinct from the identity. The double-valued or spinor representations of Γ are then ordinary representations of Γ′, and their characters determine, for instance, the splitting of energy levels of ions with an odd number of electrons in a crystal field.

== Definition and theory ==
Let Γ be a finite subgroup of SO(3), the three-dimensional rotation group. There is a natural homomorphism f of SU(2) onto SO(3) which has kernel {±I}. This double cover can be realised using the adjoint action of SU(2) on its Lie algebra $\mathfrak{su}(2)$ of traceless 2-by-2 skew-adjoint matrices or using the action by conjugation of unit quaternions. The double group Γ′ is defined as f^{−1}(Γ). By construction, {±I} is a central subgroup of Γ′ and the quotient is isomorphic to Γ. Thus Γ′ is a central extension of the group Γ by {±1}, the cyclic group of order 2. Ordinary representations of Γ′ are just mappings of Γ into the general linear group that are homomorphisms up to a sign; equivalently, they are projective representations of Γ with a factor system or Schur multiplier in {±1}. Two projective representations of Γ are closed under the tensor product operation, with their corresponding factor systems in {±1} multiplying. The central extensions of Γ by {±1} also have a natural product.

The finite subgroups of SU(2) and SO(3) were determined by Felix Klein in an article in Mathematische Annalen, later incorporated in his celebrated 1884 "Lectures on the Icosahedron": for SU(2), the subgroups correspond to the cyclic groups, the binary dihedral groups, the binary tetrahedral group, the binary octahedral group, and the binary icosahedral group; and for SO(3), they correspond to the cyclic groups, the dihedral groups, the tetrahedral group, the octahedral group and the icosahedral group. The correspondence can be found in numerous text books, and goes back to the classification of platonic solids. Besides the double group Γ′ = f^{−1}(Γ), there is always the trivial central extension Γ × {±1}; the two are in general not isomorphic. For example, the double group of the dihedral group of order 4 is the quaternion group, whereas the trivial extension is abelian.

For each binary subgroup, i.e. finite subgroup of SU(2), the irreducible representations of Γ are labelled by extended Dynkin diagrams of type A, D and E (see ADE classification); the rules for tensoring with the two-dimensional vector representation are given graphically by an undirected graph. By Schur's lemma, irreducible representations of Γ × {±1} are just irreducible representations of Γ multiplied by either the trivial or the sign character of {±1}. Likewise, irreducible representations of Γ′ that send −1 to I are just ordinary representations of Γ; while those which send −1 to −I are genuinely double-valued or spinor representations.

=== Cyclic subgroups ===
Since every element of SU(2) is conjugate to a diagonal matrix, every finite cyclic subgroup of SU(2) of order m is conjugate to the group generated by

$$g = \begin{pmatrix} \zeta & 0\\ 0 & \zeta^{-1}\end{pmatrix}, \qquad \zeta = e^{2\pi i/m},$$

which corresponds to a unit quaternion $\cos(2\pi/m) + u \sin(2\pi/m)$, with u a unit imaginary quaternion. Under the homomorphism f onto SO(3), g is mapped to a rotation by 4π/m about a fixed axis. Two cases must be distinguished:

- If m = 2n is even, the group contains g^{n} = −I. It is the preimage of the cyclic rotation group C_{n} of order n, i.e. the binary cyclic group 2C_{n}, a binary polyhedral group; in the ADE classification it has type A_{2n−1}.
- If m is odd, the group does not contain −I, and f maps it isomorphically onto the cyclic rotation group C_{m}. It is not the preimage of a rotation group, hence not a double group; in the ADE classification it has type A_{m−1}.

Since the group is abelian, it has m irreducible representations, all one-dimensional: g is represented by ζ^{k} for k = 0, 1, ..., m − 1. The two-dimensional defining representation splits into the representations with k = 1 and k = m − 1. Tensoring with it therefore maps the representation k to the sum of the representations k ± 1 (mod m), so that the McKay graph is a cycle with m vertices, the extended Dynkin diagram of type A_{m−1}. For even m = 2n, the representation k sends −I to (−1)^{k}; thus the representations with even k are ordinary representations of C_{n}, and those with odd k are spinor representations.

=== Example: the binary icosahedral group ===
For the double icosahedral group, if $\varphi$ is the golden ratio $\textstyle {1\over 2} (1 +\sqrt{5})$ with inverse $\textstyle \tilde{\varphi}={1\over 2}(-1 + \sqrt{5})$, the character table is given below: spinor characters are denoted by asterisks. The character table of the icosahedral group is also given.

Character table: double icosahedral group
| $I^\prime$ | 1 | 12C_{2}^{[5]} | 12C_{3}^{[5]} | 1C_{4}^{[2]} | 12C_{5}^{[10]} | 12C_{6}^{[10]} | 20C_{7}^{[3]} | 20C_{8}^{[6]} | 30C_{9}^{[4]} |
|---|---|---|---|---|---|---|---|---|---|
| $\chi_{1}$ | 1 | 1 | 1 | 1 | 1 | 1 | 1 | 1 | 1 |
| $\chi_{3}$ | 3 | $\varphi$ | $-\tilde{\varphi}$ | 3 | $-\tilde{\varphi}$ | $\varphi$ | 0 | 0 | −1 |
| $\chi_{3^\prime}$ | 3 | $-\tilde{\varphi}$ | $\varphi$ | 3 | $\varphi$ | $-\tilde{\varphi}$ | 0 | 0 | −1 |
| $\chi_{4}$ | 4 | −1 | −1 | 4 | −1 | −1 | 1 | 1 | 0 |
| $\chi_{5}$ | 5 | 0 | 0 | 5 | 0 | 0 | −1 | −1 | 1 |
| $\chi_2^*$ | 2 | $-\varphi$ | $\tilde{\varphi}$ | −2 | $-\tilde{\varphi}$ | $\varphi$ | −1 | 1 | 0 |
| $\chi_{2^\prime}^*$ | 2 | $\tilde{\varphi}$ | $-\varphi$ | −2 | $\varphi$ | $-\tilde{\varphi}$ | −1 | 1 | 0 |
| $\chi_4^*$ | 4 | −1 | −1 | −4 | 1 | 1 | 1 | −1 | 0 |
| $\chi_6^*$ | 6 | 1 | 1 | −6 | −1 | −1 | 0 | 0 | 0 |

Character table: icosahedral group
| $I$ | 1 | 20C_{2}^{[3]} | 15C_{3}^{[2]} | 12C_{4}^{[5]} | 12C_{5}^{[5]} |
|---|---|---|---|---|---|
| $\chi_1$ | 1 | 1 | 1 | 1 | 1 |
| $\chi_3$ | 3 | 0 | −1 | $\varphi$ | $-\tilde{\varphi}$ |
| $\chi_{3^\prime}$ | 3 | 0 | −1 | $-\tilde{\varphi}$ | $\varphi$ |
| $\chi_4$ | 4 | 1 | 0 | −1 | −1 |
| $\chi_5$ | 5 | −1 | 1 | 0 | 0 |

The tensor product rules for tensoring with the two-dimensional representation are encoded diagrammatically below:

The numbering has at the top $\chi_{3^\prime}$ and then below, from left to right, $\chi_{2^\prime}^*$, $\chi_{4}$, $\chi_6^*$, $\chi_{5}$, $\chi_4^*$, $\chi_{3}$, $\chi_2^*$, and $\chi_{1}$. Thus, on labelling the vertices by irreducible characters, the result of multiplying $\chi_2^*$ by a given irreducible character equals the sum of all irreducible characters labelled by an adjacent vertex.

=== Representations of SU(2) and branching rules ===
The representation theory of SU(2) goes back to the nineteenth century and the theory of invariants of binary forms, with the figures of Alfred Clebsch and Paul Gordan prominent. The irreducible representations of SU(2) are indexed by non-negative half integers j. If V is the two-dimensional vector representation, then V_{j} = S^{2j} V, the 2jth symmetric power of V, a (2j + 1)-dimensional vector space. Letting G be the compact group SU(2), the group G acts irreducibly on each V_{j} and satisfies the Clebsch-Gordan rules:

$$V_i \otimes V_j \cong V_{|i-j|} \oplus V_{|i-j|+1} \oplus \cdots \oplus V_{i+j -1} \oplus V_{i+j}.$$

In particular $V_j \otimes V_{{1\over 2}} \cong V_{j-{1\over 2}} \oplus V_{j+{1\over 2}}$ for j > 0, and $V_0 \otimes V_{{1\over 2}} \cong V_{{1\over 2}}.$ By definition, the matrix representing g in V_{j} is just S^{2j} ( g ). Since every g is conjugate to a diagonal matrix with diagonal entries $\zeta$ and $\zeta^{-1}$ (the order being immaterial), in this case S^{2j} ( g ) has diagonal entries $\zeta^{2j}$, $\zeta^{2j-1}$, ... , $\zeta^{-2j+1}$, $\zeta^{-2j}$. Setting $\pi_j(g) =S^{2j}(g),$ this yields the character formula

$$\chi_j(g) := {\rm Tr} \, \pi_j(g) = \sum_{k=-2j}^{2j} \zeta^k = {\zeta^{2j+1} - \zeta^{-2j-1}\over \zeta -\zeta^{-1}}.$$

Substituting $\zeta =e^{i\alpha/2}$, it follows that, if g has diagonal entries $e^{\pm i\alpha/2},$ then

$$\chi_j(g) = {\sin (j + {1/2})\alpha  \over \sin \alpha/2}.$$

Restricting V_{j} to a finite subgroup Γ′ and decomposing it into irreducible representations of Γ′ gives the branching rules; the representations with integer j yield ordinary representations of Γ, those with half-integer j yield spinor representations.

== History ==
Georg Frobenius derived and listed in 1899 the character tables of the finite subgroups of SU(2), the double cover of the rotation group SO(3). In 1875, Felix Klein had already classified these finite "binary" subgroups into the cyclic groups, the binary dihedral groups, the binary tetrahedral group, the binary octahedral group and the binary icosahedral group. Alternative derivations of the character tables were given by Issai Schur and H. E. Jordan in 1907; further branching rules and tensor product formulas were also determined.

In a 1929 article on splitting of atoms in crystals, the physicist H. Bethe first coined the term "double group" (Doppelgruppe), a concept that allowed double-valued or spinor representations of finite subgroups of the rotation group to be regarded as ordinary linear representations of their double covers. (Note: In his 1931 book Gruppentheorie und ihre Anwendung auf die Quantenmechanik der Atomspektren, Eugene Wigner describes in detail how SU(2) arises as a double cover of SO(3), following Hermann Weyl. Referring to a 1928 article of von Neumann and Wigner in Zeitschrift für Physik (vol. 49), Bethe (1929) explains why double-valued representations of finite groups are involved.) Bethe applied his theory to the crystallographic point groups, where a natural physical restriction to 32 point groups occurs. The non-crystallographic icosahedral case has been investigated more extensively since the discovery of the fullerene C_{60}.

== Applications ==
Character tables of double groups are standard tools in physics and chemistry, for instance in the theory of the splitting of atomic energy levels in crystals and of the magnetic properties of transition-metal and lanthanide complexes. Character tables for the double groups T′, O′, T_{d}′, D_{3h}′, C_{6v}′, D_{6}′, D_{2d}′, C_{4v}′, D_{4}′, C_{3v}′, D_{3}′, C_{2v}′, D_{2}′ and R(3)′ are given in Koster et al. (1963), Salthouse & Ware (1972) and Cornwell (1984). (Note: R(3)′ refers to SU(2), the double cover of the three-dimensional rotation group SO(3))
