= Binary icosahedral group =

Nonabelian group of order 120

In mathematics, the binary icosahedral group 2I or ⟨2,3,5⟩ is a certain nonabelian group of order 120. It is an extension of the icosahedral group I or (2,3,5) of order 60 by the cyclic group of order 2, and is the preimage of the icosahedral group under the 2:1 covering homomorphism

$$\operatorname{Spin}(3) \to \operatorname{SO}(3)\,$$

of the special orthogonal group by the spin group. It follows that the binary icosahedral group is a discrete subgroup of Spin(3) of order 120.

It should not be confused with the full icosahedral group, which is a different group of order 120, and is rather a subgroup of the orthogonal group O(3).

In the algebra of quaternions, the binary icosahedral group is concretely realized as a discrete subgroup of the versors, which are the quaternions of norm one. For more information see Quaternions and spatial rotations.

== Elements ==
120 quaternion elements seen in 12-fold projection. Element orders are given: 1,2,3,4,5,6,10

Explicitly, the binary icosahedral group is given as the union of all even permutations of the following vectors:

- 8 even permutations of $(\pm 1, 0, 0, 0)$
- 16 even permutations of $(\pm 1/2, \pm 1/2, \pm 1/2, \pm 1/2)$
- 96 even permutations of $(0, \pm 1/2, \pm 1/2\varphi, \pm \varphi/2)$

Here $\varphi = \frac{1 + \sqrt{5}} {2}$ is the golden ratio.

In total there are 120 elements, namely the unit icosians. They all have unit magnitude and therefore lie in the unit quaternion group Sp(1).

The 120 elements in 4-dimensional space match the 120 vertices of the 600-cell, a regular 4-polytope.

== Properties ==
=== Central extension ===
The binary icosahedral group, denoted by 2I, is the universal perfect central extension of the icosahedral group, and thus is quasisimple: it is a perfect central extension of a simple group.

Explicitly, it fits into the short exact sequence

$$1\to\{\pm 1\}\to 2I\to I \to 1.\,$$

This sequence does not split, meaning that 2I is not a semidirect product of { ±1 } by I. In fact, there is no subgroup of 2I isomorphic to I.

The center of 2I is the subgroup { ±1 }, so that the inner automorphism group is isomorphic to I. The full automorphism group is isomorphic to S_{5} (the symmetric group on 5 letters), just as for $I\cong A_5$ - any automorphism of 2I fixes the non-trivial element of the center ($-1$), hence descends to an automorphism of I, and conversely, any automorphism of I lifts to an automorphism of 2I, since the lift of generators of I are generators of 2I (different lifts give the same automorphism).

=== Superperfect ===
The binary icosahedral group is perfect, meaning that it is equal to its commutator subgroup. In fact, 2I is the unique perfect group of order 120. It follows that 2I is not solvable.

Further, the binary icosahedral group is superperfect, meaning abstractly that its first two group homology groups vanish: $H_1(2I;\mathbf{Z})\cong H_2(2I;\mathbf{Z})\cong 0.$ Concretely, this means that its abelianization is trivial (it has no non-trivial abelian quotients) and that its Schur multiplier is trivial (it has no non-trivial perfect central extensions). In fact, the binary icosahedral group is the smallest (non-trivial) superperfect group.

The binary icosahedral group is not acyclic, however, as H_{n}(2I,Z) is cyclic of order 120 for n = 4k+3, and trivial for n > 0 otherwise, (Adem & Milgram 1994, p. 279).

=== Isomorphisms ===
Concretely, the binary icosahedral group is a subgroup of Spin(3), and covers the icosahedral group, which is a subgroup of SO(3). Abstractly, the icosahedral group is isomorphic to the symmetries of the 4-simplex, which is a subgroup of SO(4), and the binary icosahedral group is isomorphic to the double cover of this in Spin(4). Note that the symmetric group $S_5$ does have a 4-dimensional representation (its usual lowest-dimensional irreducible representation as the full symmetries of the $(n-1)$-simplex), and that the full symmetries of the 4-simplex are thus $S_5,$ not the full icosahedral group (these are two different groups of order 120).

The binary icosahedral group can be considered as the double cover of the alternating group $A_5,$ denoted $2\cdot A_5 \cong 2I;$ this isomorphism covers the isomorphism of the icosahedral group with the alternating group $A_5 \cong I.$ Just as $I$ is a discrete subgroup of $\mathrm{SO}(3)$, $2I$ is a discrete subgroup of the double cover of $\mathrm{SO}(3)$, namely $\mathrm{Spin}(3) \cong \mathrm{SU}(2)$. The 2-1 homomorphism from $\mathrm{Spin}(3)$ to $\mathrm{SO}(3)$ then restricts to the 2-1 homomorphism from $2I$ to $I$.

One can show that the binary icosahedral group is isomorphic to the special linear group SL(2,5) — the group of all 2×2 matrices over the finite field F_{5} with unit determinant; this covers the exceptional isomorphism of $I\cong A_5$ with the projective special linear group PSL(2,5).

Note also the exceptional isomorphism $PGL(2,5) \cong S_5,$ which is a different group of order 120, with the commutative square of SL, GL, PSL, PGL being isomorphic to a commutative square of $2\cdot A_5, 2\cdot S_5, A_5, S_5,$ which are isomorphic to subgroups of the commutative square of Spin(4), Pin(4), SO(4), O(4).

=== Presentation ===
The group 2I has a presentation given by

$$\langle r,s,t \mid r^2 = s^3 = t^5 = rst \rangle$$

or equivalently,

$\langle s,t \mid (st)^2 = s^3 = t^5 \rangle.$

Generators in the group of unit quaternions with these relations are given by

$$s = \tfrac{1}{2}(1+i+j+k) \qquad t = \tfrac{1}{2}(\varphi+\varphi^{-1}i+j).$$

=== Subgroups ===
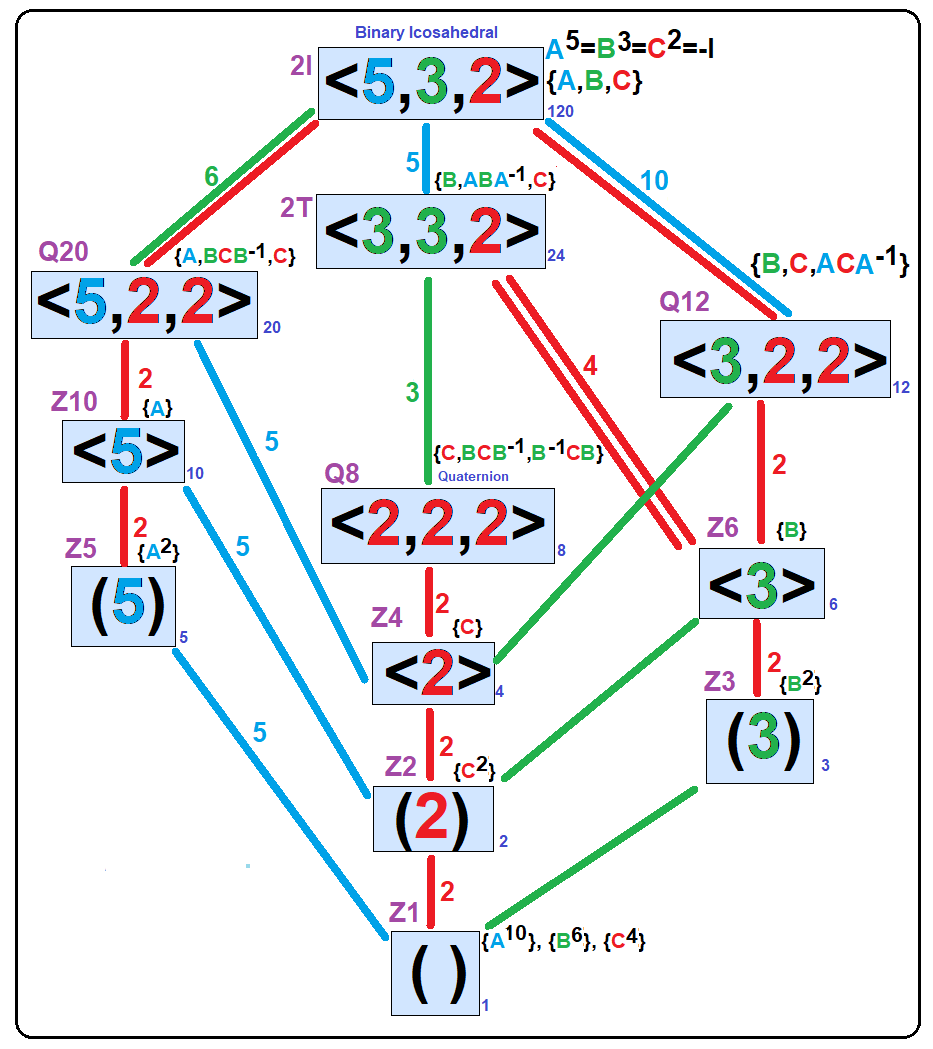
Subgroups: • binary tetrahedral group: 2T=⟨2,3,3⟩ • 3 binary dihedral groups: Q_{20}=⟨2,2,5⟩, Q_{12}=⟨2,2,3⟩, Q_{8}=⟨2,2,2⟩ • 3 binary cyclic groups: Z_{10}=⟨5⟩, Z_{6}=⟨3⟩, Z_{4}=⟨2⟩ • 3 cyclic groups: Z_{5}=(5), Z_{3}=(3), Z_{2}=(2) • 1 trivial group: ( )

The only proper normal subgroup of 2I is the center { ±1 }.

By the third isomorphism theorem, there is a Galois connection between subgroups of 2I and subgroups of I, where the closure operator on subgroups of 2I is multiplication by { ±1 }.

$-1$ is the only element of order 2, hence it is contained in all subgroups of even order: thus every subgroup of 2I is either of odd order or is the preimage of a subgroup of I.

Besides the cyclic groups generated by the various elements (which can have odd order), the only other subgroups of 2I (up to conjugation) are:

- binary dihedral groups, Dic_{5}=Q20=⟨2,2,5⟩, order 20 and Dic_{3}=Q12=⟨2,2,3⟩ of order 12
- the quaternion group, Q8=⟨2,2,2⟩, consisting of the 8 Lipschitz units forms a subgroup of index 15, which is also the dicyclic group Dic_{2}; this covers the stabilizer of an edge.
- the 24 Hurwitz units form an index 5 subgroup called the binary tetrahedral group; this covers a chiral tetrahedral group. This group is self-normalizing so its conjugacy class has 5 members (this gives a map $2I \to S_5$ whose image is $A_5$).

== Relation to 4-dimensional symmetry groups ==
The 4-dimensional analog of the icosahedral symmetry group I_{h} is the symmetry group of the 600-cell (also that of its dual, the 120-cell). Just as the former is the Coxeter group of type H_{3}, the latter is the Coxeter group of type H_{4}, also denoted [3,3,5]. Its rotational subgroup, denoted [3,3,5]^{+} is a group of order 7200 living in SO(4). SO(4) has a double cover called Spin(4) in much the same way that Spin(3) is the double cover of SO(3). Similar to the isomorphism Spin(3) = Sp(1), the group Spin(4) is isomorphic to Sp(1) × Sp(1).

The preimage of [3,3,5]^{+} in Spin(4) (a four-dimensional analogue of 2I) is precisely the product group 2I × 2I of order 14400. The rotational symmetry group of the 600-cell is then

[3,3,5]^{+} = ( 2I × 2I ) / { ±1 }.

Various other 4-dimensional symmetry groups can be constructed from 2I.

== Applications ==
The coset space Spin(3) / 2I = S^{3} / 2I is a spherical 3-manifold called the Poincaré homology sphere. It is an example of a homology sphere, i.e. a 3-manifold whose homology groups are identical to those of a 3-sphere. The fundamental group of the Poincaré sphere is isomorphic to the binary icosahedral group, as the Poincaré sphere is the quotient of a 3-sphere by the binary icosahedral group.

== See also ==
- Binary polyhedral group
- Binary cyclic group, ⟨n⟩, order 2n
- Binary dihedral group, ⟨2,2,n⟩, order 4n
- Binary tetrahedral group, 2T=⟨2,3,3⟩, order 24
- Binary octahedral group, 2O=⟨2,3,4⟩, order 48
