= Quaternionic polytope =

Concept in geometry

In geometry, a quaternionic polytope is a generalization of a polytope in real space to an analogous structure in a quaternionic module, where each real dimension is accompanied by three imaginary ones. Similarly to complex polytopes, points are not ordered and there is no sense of "between", and thus a quaternionic polytope may be understood as an arrangement of connected points, lines, planes and so on, where every point is the junction of multiple lines, every line of multiple planes, and so on. Likewise, each line must contain multiple points, each plane multiple lines, and so on. Since the quaternions are non-commutative, a convention must be made for the multiplication of vectors by scalars, which is usually in favour of left-multiplication.

As is the case for the complex polytopes, the only quaternionic polytopes to have been systematically studied are the regular ones. Like the real and complex regular polytopes, their symmetry groups may be described as reflection groups. For example, the regular quaternionic lines are in a one-to-one correspondence with the finite subgroups of U_{1}(H): the binary cyclic groups, binary dihedral groups, binary tetrahedral group, binary octahedral group, and binary icosahedral group.
