= Binary polyhedral group =

Double cover of a finite rotation group in three dimensions

In mathematics, a binary polyhedral group is a finite group that describes a finite group of rotations in three-dimensional space, such as the rotational symmetries of a regular polyhedron, in a "doubled" form. The doubling comes from distinguishing a rotation by an angle θ from the rotation by θ + 360° about the same axis: as transformations of space they are the same, but in the binary group they are different elements, and only a rotation by 720° counts as the identity. (That this distinction is meaningful is illustrated by the plate trick.) Each rotation of the original group thus corresponds to two elements of the binary group, which therefore has twice as many elements. For example, the group consisting of the identity and a half turn about some axis has two elements; its binary group consists of the rotations by 0°, 180°, 360°, and 540° about this axis, and is cyclic of order 4.

Rotations with angles counted modulo 720° are conveniently described by unit quaternions. Every rotation is represented by two unit quaternions, q and −q (see quaternions and spatial rotation); the binary polyhedral group of a finite rotation group consists of both quaternions ±q for each of its rotations. Since the unit quaternions can be identified with the special unitary group SU(2) and with the spin group Spin(3), the binary polyhedral groups can also be described as finite groups of 2×2 unitary matrices, or as the preimages of finite rotation groups under the two-to-one covering homomorphism from Spin(3) onto the rotation group SO(3). Each binary polyhedral group is named after the corresponding rotation group with the prefix binary: the binary cyclic, binary dihedral, binary tetrahedral, binary octahedral, and binary icosahedral groups.

Binary polyhedral groups are not point groups: on three-dimensional space they act only through the covering map, so that each rotation is represented by two group elements. They do, however, act faithfully on two-dimensional complex space, on the 3-sphere, and on spinors. This makes them relevant in several fields: in physics and chemistry, where they are known as double groups and describe the symmetry of particles with half-integer spin; in the ADE classification, where they correspond to the simply-laced Dynkin diagrams and to the Du Val singularities; and in the geometry of 4-polytopes and of spherical 3-manifolds.

== Definition ==
Each unit quaternion q defines a rotation of three-dimensional space by

$$v \mapsto q v q^{-1},$$

where v is a purely imaginary quaternion, identified with a vector in R^{3}. This map from the unit quaternions onto SO(3) is a group homomorphism with kernel {1, −1}; the quaternions q and −q define the same rotation. It is the double cover of SO(3) by Spin(3), which is simply connected.

If G is a finite subgroup of SO(3), its preimage 2G is a finite subgroup of Spin(3) of order 2|G|, containing −1. Conversely, since −1 is the only element of order 2 in Spin(3), every finite subgroup of Spin(3) of even order contains −1 and is therefore the preimage of its image. The finite subgroups of odd order are cyclic, and are mapped isomorphically onto cyclic rotation groups. Hence the finite subgroups of SU(2) are the binary polyhedral groups and the cyclic groups of odd order. Their representations and character tables are treated in finite subgroups of SU(2).

=== Example: the quaternion group ===
A rotation by the angle θ about an axis with unit vector (u_{x}, u_{y}, u_{z}) is represented by the two quaternions

$$\pm\left(\cos\tfrac{\theta}{2} + (u_x i + u_y j + u_z k)\sin\tfrac{\theta}{2}\right).$$

For θ = 0° and θ = 360°, the expression in parentheses equals 1 and −1, respectively; both describe the identity rotation.

The dihedral group D_{2} consists of the identity and the three rotations by 180° about the coordinate axes. With θ = 180°, these four rotations correspond to the eight quaternions ±1, ±i, ±j, ±k, which form the binary dihedral group ⟨2,2,2⟩. This is the quaternion group Q_{8}. Whereas D_{2} is abelian, Q_{8} is not: ij = k but ji = −k, although both products describe the same rotation by 180° about the z axis. The quaternion group is not isomorphic to any point group in three dimensions, which illustrates that binary polyhedral groups are genuinely different from point groups.

== Classification ==
The finite rotation groups are the cyclic groups C_{n}, the dihedral groups D_{n}, and the tetrahedral, octahedral, and icosahedral groups T, O, and I. The polyhedral groups with notation (l,m,n) have binary counterparts ⟨l,m,n⟩, which Threlfall defined by the presentation

$\langle l,m,n\rangle = \langle r,s,t \mid r^l = s^m = t^n = rst\rangle.$

The central element rst has order 2 and corresponds to −1. The order of ⟨l,m,n⟩ is $4/(1/l+1/m+1/n-1)$.

Rotation group	Order	Binary group	Order	Other descriptions	ADE type
C_{n}	n	binary cyclic group 2C_{n}	2n	cyclic group Z_{2n}	A_{2n−1}
D_{n} = (2,2,n)	2n	binary dihedral group ⟨2,2,n⟩	4n	dicyclic group Dic_{n}; for n = 2 the quaternion group	D_{n+2}
T = (2,3,3)	12	binary tetrahedral group ⟨2,3,3⟩	24	SL(2,3); the 24 Hurwitz quaternion units	E_{6}
O = (2,3,4)	24	binary octahedral group ⟨2,3,4⟩	48		E_{7}
I = (2,3,5)	60	binary icosahedral group ⟨2,3,5⟩	120	the 120 unit icosians	E_{8}

The cyclic groups of odd order n + 1, which are not binary groups, correspond to the remaining ADE types A_{n} with even n.

As sets of unit quaternions, the binary tetrahedral group forms the 24 vertices of the 24-cell, the binary icosahedral group forms the 120 vertices of the 600-cell, and the binary octahedral group forms the vertices of a 24-cell together with those of its dual. The 120 icosians together with their multiples by the golden ratio τ correspond to the 240 roots of E_{8}.

== Further properties ==
=== ADE classification and singularities ===
The quotient C^{2}/Γ of complex 2-space by a finite subgroup Γ of SU(2), already studied by Felix Klein, is called a Kleinian singularity or rational double point. In the minimal resolution of this singularity, the exceptional curves intersect according to a Dynkin diagram of type A, D, or E. McKay observed that the same diagram, in its extended form, also arises directly from the group: its vertices are the irreducible representations of Γ, connected according to their tensor products with the two-dimensional defining representation. This McKay correspondence relates the finite subgroups of SU(2) one-to-one to the simply-laced Dynkin diagrams. Kronheimer used it to construct ALE gravitational instantons as hyperkähler manifolds asymptotic to C^{2}/Γ.

=== Spherical 3-manifolds ===
Every finite subgroup Γ of SU(2) acts freely on the 3-sphere by left multiplication, so that the quotient S^{3}/Γ is a spherical 3-manifold. For the binary icosahedral group, this quotient is the Poincaré homology sphere.

== Applications in physics and chemistry ==
The wavefunction of a particle with half-integer spin changes sign under a rotation by 360°. Its symmetry under the rotations of a point group G is therefore described by representations of the binary group 2G, in which the rotation by 360° is represented by −1. Hans Bethe introduced these groups in 1929 as Doppelgruppen (double groups) to describe the splitting of atomic energy levels in the crystal field of a solid. Opechowski studied the crystallographic double groups in 1940; the rule for their conjugacy classes is known as Opechowski's theorem. Character tables of the double groups have been compiled for the 32 crystallographic point groups by Koster et al. (1963) and for 75 point groups by Altmann and Herzig (1994).
