= Spherical 3-manifold =

Subclass of manifold

In mathematics, a spherical 3-manifold M is a 3-manifold of the form

$$M=S^3/\Gamma$$

where $\Gamma$ is a finite subgroup of O(4) acting freely by rotations on the 3-sphere $S^3$. All such manifolds are prime, orientable, and closed. Spherical 3-manifolds are sometimes called elliptic 3-manifolds.

== Properties ==
A special case of the Bonnet–Myers theorem says that every smooth manifold which has a smooth Riemannian metric which is both geodesically complete and of constant positive curvature must be closed and have finite fundamental group. William Thurston's elliptization conjecture, proven by Grigori Perelman using Richard Hamilton's Ricci flow, states a converse: every closed three-dimensional manifold with finite fundamental group has a smooth Riemannian metric of constant positive curvature. (This converse is special to three dimensions.) As such, the spherical three-manifolds are precisely the closed 3-manifolds with finite fundamental group.

According to Synge's theorem, every spherical 3-manifold is orientable, and in particular $\Gamma$ must be included in SO(4). The fundamental group is either cyclic, or is a central extension of a dihedral, tetrahedral, octahedral, or icosahedral group by a cyclic group of even order. This divides the set of such manifolds into five classes, described in the following sections.

The spherical manifolds are exactly the manifolds with spherical geometry, one of the eight geometries of Thurston's geometrization conjecture.

== Cyclic case (lens spaces) ==
The manifolds $S^3/\Gamma$ with Γ cyclic are precisely the 3-dimensional lens spaces. A lens space is not determined by its fundamental group (there are non-homeomorphic lens spaces with isomorphic fundamental groups); but any other spherical manifold is.

Three-dimensional lens spaces arise as quotients of $S^3 \subset \mathbb{C}^2$ by the action of the group that is generated by elements of the form

$$\begin{pmatrix}\omega &0\\0&\omega^q\end{pmatrix}.$$

where $\omega=e^{2\pi i/p}$. Such a lens space $L(p;q)$ has fundamental group $\mathbb{Z}/p\mathbb{Z}$ for all $q$, so spaces with different $p$ are not homotopy equivalent. Moreover, classifications up to homeomorphism and homotopy equivalence are known, as follows. The three-dimensional spaces $L(p;q_1)$ and $L(p;q_2)$ are:

1. homotopy equivalent if and only if $q_1 q_2 \equiv \pm n^2 \pmod{p}$ for some $n \in \mathbb{N};$
2. homeomorphic if and only if $q_1 \equiv \pm q_2^{\pm1} \pmod{p}.$

In particular, the lens spaces L(7,1) and L(7,2) give examples of two 3-manifolds that are homotopy equivalent but not homeomorphic.

The lens space L(1,0) is the 3-sphere, and the lens space L(2,1) is 3 dimensional real projective space.

Lens spaces can be represented as Seifert fiber spaces in many ways, usually as fiber spaces over the 2-sphere with at most two exceptional fibers, though the lens space with fundamental group of order 4 also has a representation as a Seifert fiber space over the projective plane with no exceptional fibers.

== Dihedral case (prism manifolds) ==
A prism manifold is a closed 3-dimensional manifold M whose fundamental group is a central extension of a dihedral group.

The fundamental group π_{1}(M) of M is a product of a cyclic group of order m with a group having presentation

$$\langle x,y\mid xyx^{-1}=y^{-1}, x^{2^k}=y^n\rangle$$

for integers k, m, n with k ≥ 1, m ≥ 1, n ≥ 2 and m coprime to 2n.

Alternatively, the fundamental group has presentation

$$\langle x,y \mid xyx^{-1}=y^{-1}, x^{2m}=y^n\rangle$$

for coprime integers m, n with m ≥ 1, n ≥ 2. (The n here equals the previous n, and the m here is 2^{k-1} times the previous m.)

We continue with the latter presentation. This group is a metacyclic group of order 4mn with abelianization of order 4m (so m and n are both determined by this group). The element y generates a cyclic normal subgroup of order 2n, and the element x has order 4m. The center is cyclic of order 2m and is generated by x^{2}, and the quotient by the center is the dihedral group of order 2n.

When m = 1 this group is a binary dihedral or dicyclic group. The simplest example is m = 1, n = 2, when π_{1}(M) is the quaternion group of order 8.

Prism manifolds are uniquely determined by their fundamental groups: if a closed 3-manifold has the same fundamental group as a prism manifold M, it is homeomorphic to M.

Prism manifolds can be represented as Seifert fiber spaces in two ways.

== Tetrahedral case ==
The fundamental group is a product of a cyclic group of order m with a group having presentation

$$\langle x,y,z \mid (xy)^2=x^2=y^2, zxz^{-1}=y,zyz^{-1}=xy, z^{3^k}=1\rangle$$

for integers k, m with k ≥ 1, m ≥ 1 and m coprime to 6.

Alternatively, the fundamental group has presentation

$$\langle x,y,z \mid (xy)^2=x^2=y^2, zxz^{-1}=y,zyz^{-1}=xy, z^{3m}=1\rangle$$

for an odd integer m ≥ 1. (The m here is 3^{k-1} times the previous m.)

We continue with the latter presentation. This group has order 24m. The elements x and y generate a normal subgroup isomorphic to the quaternion group of order 8. The center is cyclic of order 2m. It is generated by the elements z^{3} and x^{2} = y^{2}, and the quotient by the center is the tetrahedral group, equivalently, the alternating group A_{4}.

When m = 1 this group is the binary tetrahedral group.

These manifolds are uniquely determined by their fundamental groups. They can all be represented in an essentially unique way as Seifert fiber spaces: the quotient manifold is a sphere and there are 3 exceptional fibers of orders 2, 3, and 3.

== Octahedral case ==
The fundamental group is a product of a cyclic group of order m coprime to 6 with the binary octahedral group (of order 48) which has the presentation

$$\langle x,y \mid (xy)^2=x^3=y^4\rangle.$$

These manifolds are uniquely determined by their fundamental groups. They can all be represented in an essentially unique way as Seifert fiber spaces: the quotient manifold is a sphere and there are 3 exceptional fibers of orders 2, 3, and 4.

== Icosahedral case ==
The fundamental group is a product of a cyclic group of order m coprime to 30 with the binary icosahedral group (order 120) which has the presentation

$$\langle x,y \mid (xy)^2=x^3=y^5\rangle.$$

When m is 1, the manifold is the Poincaré homology sphere.

These manifolds are uniquely determined by their fundamental groups. They can all be represented in an essentially unique way as Seifert fiber spaces: the quotient manifold is a sphere and there are 3 exceptional fibers of orders 2, 3, and 5.
