= Versor (disambiguation) =

In mathematics, a versor is a quaternion of norm one (a unit quaternion).

Versor may also refer to:

- Hyperbolic versor, a generalization of quaternionic versors
- Versor (physics), a vector of norm 1 (unit vector) codirectional with another vector
- A product of vectors in geometric algebra
