= Dicyclic group =

Type of cyclic group in group theory

In group theory, a dicyclic group (notation Dic_{n} or Q_{4n}, ⟨n,2,2⟩) is a particular kind of non-abelian group of order 4n (n > 1). It is an extension of the cyclic group of order 2 by a cyclic group of order 2n, giving the name di-cyclic. In the notation of exact sequences of groups, this extension can be expressed as:

$$1 \to C_{2n} \to \mbox{Dic}_n \to C_2 \to 1. \,$$

More generally, given any finite abelian group with an order-2 element, one can define a dicyclic group.

== Definition ==
For each integer n > 1, the dicyclic group $\operatorname{Dic}_n$ can be defined as the subgroup of the unit quaternions generated by

$$\begin{align}
a & = e^\frac{i\pi}{n} = \cos\frac{\pi}{n} + i\sin\frac{\pi}{n} \\
x & = j
\end{align}$$

More abstractly, one can define the dicyclic group $\operatorname{Dic}_n$ as the group with the following presentation

$$\operatorname{Dic}_n = \left\langle a, x \mid a^{2n} = 1,\ x^2 = a^n,\ x^{-1}ax = a^{-1}\right\rangle.\,\!$$

The relation $a^{2n} = 1$ in this presentation is redundant, since it is implied by the other two relations. So the dicyclic group $\operatorname{Dic}_n$ has also a shorter presentation with only two relations

$$\left\langle a, x \mid x^2 = a^n,\ axa = x\right\rangle.\,\!$$

Some things to note which follow from this definition:

- $a^{2n} = 1$
- $x^4 = 1$
- $x^2 a^m = a^{m+n} = a^m x^2$
- if $l = \pm 1$, then $x^l a^m = a^{-m} x^l$
- $a^m x^{-1}= a^{m-n} a^n x^{-1}= a^{m-n} x^2 x^{-1}= a^{m-n} x$

Thus, every element of $\operatorname{Dic}_n$ can be uniquely written as $a^mx^l$, where $0 \le m < 2n$ and $l=0$ or $1$. The multiplication rules are given by

- $a^k a^m = a^{k+m}$
- $a^k a^m x = a^{k+m}x$
- $a^k x a^m = a^{k-m}x$
- $a^k x a^m x = a^{k-m+n}$

It follows that $\operatorname{Dic}_n$ has order 4n.

When n = 2, the dicyclic group is isomorphic to the quaternion group Q. More generally, when n is a power of 2, the dicyclic group is isomorphic to the generalized quaternion group.

== Properties ==
For each n > 1, the dicyclic group $\operatorname{Dic}_n$ is a non-abelian group of order 4n. (For the degenerate case n = 1, the group $\operatorname{Dic}_1$ is the cyclic group $C_4$, which is not considered dicyclic.)

Let $A = \langle a \rangle$ be the subgroup of $\operatorname{Dic}_n$ generated by $a$. Then $A$ is a cyclic group of order $2n$, so $[\operatorname{Dic}_n : A] = 2$. As a subgroup of index 2 it is automatically a normal subgroup. The quotient group $\operatorname{Dic}_n/A$ is a cyclic group of order 2.

$\operatorname{Dic}_n$ is solvable; note that $A$ is normal, and being abelian, is itself solvable.

== Binary dihedral group ==

The dicyclic group is a binary polyhedral group — it is one of the classes of subgroups of the Pin group Pin_{−}(2), which is a subgroup of the Spin group Spin(3) — and in this context is known as the binary dihedral group.

The connection with the binary cyclic group C_{2n}, the cyclic group C_{n}, and the dihedral group Dih_{n} of order 2n is illustrated in the diagram at right, and parallels the corresponding diagram for the Pin group. Coxeter writes the binary dihedral group as ⟨2,2,n⟩ and binary cyclic group with angle-brackets, ⟨n⟩.

There is a superficial resemblance between the dicyclic groups and dihedral groups; both are a sort of "mirroring" of an underlying cyclic group. But the presentation of a dihedral group would have $x^2 = 1$, instead of $x^2 = a^n$; and this yields a different structure. In particular, $\operatorname{Dic}_n$ is not a semidirect product of $A$ and $\langle x \rangle$, since $A \cap \langle x \rangle$ is not trivial.

The dicyclic group has a unique involution (i.e. an element of order 2), namely $x^2 = a^n$. Note that this element lies in the center of $\operatorname{Dic}_n$. Indeed, the center consists solely of the identity element and $x^2$. If we add the relation $x^2 = 1$ to the presentation of $\operatorname{Dic}_n$ one obtains a presentation of the dihedral group Dih_{n}, so the quotient group $\operatorname{Dic}_n/\langle x^2 \rangle$ is isomorphic to Dih_{n}.

There is a natural 2-to-1 homomorphism from the group of unit quaternions to the 3-dimensional rotation group described at quaternions and spatial rotations. Since the dicyclic group can be embedded inside the unit quaternions one can ask what the image of it is under this homomorphism. The answer is just the dihedral symmetry group Dih_{n}. For this reason the dicyclic group is also known as the binary dihedral group. Note that the dicyclic group does not contain any subgroup isomorphic to Dih_{n}.

The analogous pre-image construction, using Pin_{+}(2) instead of Pin_{−}(2), yields another dihedral group, Dih_{2n}, rather than a dicyclic group.

== Generalizations ==
Let A be an abelian group, having a specific element y in A with order 2. A group G is called a generalized dicyclic group, written as Dic(A, y), if it is generated by A and an additional element x, and in addition we have that [G : A] = 2, x^{2} = y, and for all $a$ in A, $x^{-1}ax = a^{-1}$.

Since for a cyclic group of even order, there is always a unique element of order 2, we can see that dicyclic groups are just a specific type of generalized dicyclic group.

The dicyclic group is the case $(p,q,r)=(2,2,n)$ of the family of binary triangle groups $\Gamma(p,q,r)$ defined by the presentation:

$\langle a,b,c \mid a^p = b^q = c^r = abc \rangle.$

Taking the quotient by the additional relation $abc = e$ produces an ordinary triangle group, which in this case is the dihedral quotient $\mathrm{Dic}_n\rightarrow \mathrm{Dih}_n$.

== See also ==
- Binary polyhedral group
  - Binary cyclic group, ⟨n⟩, order 2n
  - Binary tetrahedral group, 2T = ⟨2,3,3⟩, order 24
  - Binary octahedral group, 2O = ⟨2,3,4⟩, order 48
  - Binary icosahedral group, 2I = ⟨2,3,5⟩, order 120
