= Binary cyclic group =

Algebraic structure

In mathematics, the binary cyclic group of the n-gon is the cyclic group of order 2n, $C_{2n}$, thought of as an extension of the cyclic group $C_n$ by a cyclic group of order 2. Coxeter writes the binary cyclic group with angle-brackets, ⟨n⟩, and the index 2 subgroup as (n) or [n]^{+}.

It is the binary polyhedral group corresponding to the cyclic group.

In terms of binary polyhedral groups, the binary cyclic group is the preimage of the cyclic group of rotations ($C_n < \operatorname{SO}(3)$) under the 2:1 covering homomorphism

$$\operatorname{Spin}(3) \to \operatorname{SO}(3)\,$$

of the special orthogonal group by the spin group.

As a subgroup of the spin group, the binary cyclic group can be described concretely as a discrete subgroup of the unit quaternions, under the isomorphism $\operatorname{Spin}(3) \cong \operatorname{Sp}(1)$ where Sp(1) is the multiplicative group of unit quaternions. (For a description of this homomorphism see the article on quaternions and spatial rotations.)

== Presentation ==
The binary cyclic group can be defined as the set of $2n$^{th} roots of unity—that is, the set $\left\{\omega_n^k \; | \; k \in \{0,1,2,...,2n-1\}\right\}$, where

$$\omega_n = e^{i\pi/n} = \cos\frac{\pi}{n} + i\sin\frac{\pi}{n},$$

using multiplication as the group operation.

== See also ==
- binary dihedral group, ⟨2,2,n⟩, order 4n
- binary tetrahedral group, ⟨2,3,3⟩, order 24
- binary octahedral group, ⟨2,3,4⟩, order 48
- binary icosahedral group, ⟨2,3,5⟩, order 120
