= Spin group =

Double cover Lie group of the special orthogonal group

In mathematics the spin group, denoted Spin(n), is a Lie group whose underlying manifold is the double cover of the special orthogonal group SO(n) = SO(n, R), such that there exists a short exact sequence of Lie groups (when n ≠ 2)

$$1 \to \mathbb{Z}_2 \to \operatorname{Spin}(n) \to \operatorname{SO}(n) \to 1.$$

The group multiplication law on the double cover is given by lifting the multiplication on $\operatorname{SO}(n)$.

As a Lie group, Spin(n) therefore shares its dimension, (n(n − 1))/2, and its Lie algebra with the special orthogonal group.

For n > 2, Spin(n) is simply connected and so coincides with the universal cover of SO(n).

The non-trivial element of the kernel is denoted −1, which should not be confused with the orthogonal transform of reflection through the origin, generally denoted −I.

Spin(n) can be constructed as a subgroup of the invertible elements in the Clifford algebra Cl(n). A distinct article discusses the spin representations.

== Use for physics models ==
The spin group is used in physics when describing the symmetries of (electrically neutral, uncharged) fermions. Its complexification, Spinc, is used to describe electrically charged fermions, most notably the electron. Strictly speaking, the spin group describes a fermion in a zero-dimensional space; however, space is not zero-dimensional, and so the spin group is used to define (non-existent) spin structures as a calculation tool on (pseudo-)Riemannian manifolds: the spin group is the structure group of a spinor bundle. The affine connection on a spinor bundle is the spin connection; the spin connection can simplify calculations in general relativity. The spin connection in turn enables the Dirac equation to be written in curved spacetime (effectively in the tetrad coordinates).

== Construction ==
Construction of the Spin group often starts with the construction of a Clifford algebra over a real vector space V with a definite quadratic form q. The Clifford algebra is the quotient of the tensor algebra TV of V by a two-sided ideal. The tensor algebra (over the reals) may be written as

$$\mathrm{T}V= \mathbb {R} \oplus V \oplus (V\otimes V) \oplus \cdots$$

The Clifford algebra Cl(V) is then the quotient algebra

$$\operatorname{Cl}(V) = \mathrm{T}V / \left( v \otimes v - q(v) \right) ,$$

where $q(v)$ is the quadratic form applied to a vector $v\in V$. The resulting space is finite dimensional, naturally graded (as a vector space), and can therefore be written as

$$\operatorname{Cl}(V) = \operatorname{Cl}^0 \oplus \operatorname{Cl}^1 \oplus \operatorname{Cl}^2 \oplus \cdots \oplus \operatorname{Cl}^n$$

where $n$ is the dimension of $V$, $\operatorname{Cl}^0 = \mathbb{R}$ and $\operatorname{Cl}^1 = V$. The spin algebra $\mathfrak{spin}$ is defined as the bivector subalgebra

$$\operatorname{Cl}^2 =\mathfrak{spin}(V) = \mathfrak{spin}(n) ,$$

where the last is a short-hand for V being a real vector space of real dimension n. It is a Lie algebra with the commutator as multiplication; it has a natural action on V, and is isomorphic to the Lie algebra $\mathfrak{so}(n)$ of the special orthogonal group: If the set $\{e_i\}$ are an orthonormal basis of the (real) vector space V, then the quotient above endows the Clifford algebra with a natural anti-commuting structure:

$e_i e_j = -e_j e_i$ for $i \ne j ,$

which follows by considering $v\otimes v$ for $v=e_i+e_j$. Then in $\mathfrak{spin}(n)$ we have that the Lie commutator $[e_i \otimes e_j, e_j \otimes e_k ]=2 e_i \otimes e_k$ and $[e_i \otimes e_j, e_k \otimes e_l ]=0$, so $e_i \otimes e_j \rightarrow 2e_i \otimes e_j -2e_j \otimes e_i$ gives the isomorphism to $\mathfrak{so}(n)$. On the right hand side $\otimes$ is the outer product. The multiplication by 2 explains why rotating a spinor by 360 degrees returns minus the spinor: in $e^{i \phi b}$ dividing the basis element b by 2 gives half a rotation for 360 degrees.

The pin group $\operatorname{Pin}(V)$ is a subgroup of $\operatorname{Cl}(V)$'s Clifford group of all elements of the form

$$v_1 v_2 \cdots v_k ,$$

where each $v_i\in V$ is of unit length: $q(v_i) = 1.$

The spin group is then defined as

$$\operatorname{Spin}(V) = \operatorname{Pin}(V) \cap \operatorname{Cl}^{\text{even}} ,$$

where $\operatorname{Cl}^\text{even}=\operatorname{Cl}^0 \oplus \operatorname{Cl}^2 \oplus \operatorname{Cl}^4 \oplus \cdots$ is the subspace generated by elements that are the product of an even number of vectors. That is, Spin(V) consists of all elements of Pin(V), given above, with the restriction to k being an even number. The restriction to the even subspace is key to the formation of two-component (Weyl) spinors, constructed below.

The anti-commutation of the Clifford algebra turns out to be of importance in physics, as it captures the spirit of the Pauli exclusion principle for fermions. A precise formulation is out of scope here, but it involves the creation of a spinor bundle on Minkowski spacetime; the resulting spinor fields can be seen to be anti-commuting as a by-product of the Clifford algebra construction. This anti-commutation property is also key to the formulation of supersymmetry. The Clifford algebra and the spin group have many interesting and curious properties, some of which are listed below.

=== Geometric construction ===
The spin groups can be constructed less explicitly but without appealing to Clifford algebras. As a manifold, $\operatorname{Spin}(n)$ is the double cover of $\operatorname{SO}(n)$. Its multiplication law can be defined by lifting as follows. Call the covering map $p: \operatorname{Spin}(n) \rightarrow \operatorname{SO}(n)$. Then $p^{-1}(\{e\})$ is a set with two elements, and one can be chosen without loss of generality to be the identity. Call this $\tilde e$. Then to define multiplication in $\operatorname{Spin}(n)$, for $a, b \in \operatorname{Spin}(n)$ choose paths $\gamma_a, \gamma_b$ satisfying $\gamma_a(0) = \gamma_b(0) = \tilde e$, and $\gamma_a(1) = a, \gamma_b(1) = b$. These define a path $\gamma$ in $\operatorname{SO}(n)$ defined $\gamma(t) = p(\gamma_a(t))\cdot p(\gamma_b(t))$ satisfying $\gamma(0) = e$. Since $\operatorname{Spin}(n)$ is a double cover, there is a unique lift $\tilde \gamma$ of $\gamma$ with $\tilde \gamma(0) = \tilde e$. Then define the product as $a \cdot b = \tilde \gamma (1)$.

It can then be shown that this definition is independent of the paths $\gamma_a, \gamma_b$, that the multiplication is continuous, and the group axioms are satisfied with inversion being continuous, making $\operatorname{Spin}(n)$ a Lie group.

== Double covering ==
For a quadratic space V, a double covering of SO(V) by Spin(V) can be given explicitly, as follows. Let $\{e_i\}$ be an orthonormal basis for V. Define an antiautomorphism $t : \operatorname{Cl}(V) \to \operatorname{Cl}(V)$ by

$$\left(e_i e_j \cdots e_k\right)^t
= e_k\cdots e_j e_i.$$

This can be extended to all elements of $a,b\in \operatorname{Cl}(V)$ by linearity. It is an antihomomorphism since

$$(a b)^t = b^t a^t.$$

Observe that $\operatorname{Pin}(V)$ can then be defined as all elements $a \in \operatorname{Cl}(V)$ for which

$$a a^t = 1.$$

Now define the automorphism $\alpha\colon \operatorname{Cl}(V)\to\operatorname{Cl}(V)$ which on degree 1 elements is given by

$$\alpha(v)=-v,\quad v\in V,$$

and let $a^*$ denote $\alpha(a)^t$, which is an antiautomorphism of $\operatorname{Cl}(V)$. With this notation, an explicit double covering is the homomorphism $\rho:\operatorname{Pin}(V)\to\operatorname O(V)$ given by

$$\rho(a) v = a v a^* ,$$

where $v \in V$. When $a$ has degree 1 (i.e. $a\in V$), $\rho(a)$ is the reflection across the hyperplane orthogonal to $a$; this follows from the anti-commuting property of the Clifford algebra.

This gives a double covering of both $\operatorname{O}(V)$ by $\operatorname{Pin}(V)$ and of $\operatorname{SO}(V)$ by $\operatorname{Spin}(V)$ because $a$ gives the same transformation as $-a$.

== Spinor space ==
It is worth reviewing how spinor space and Weyl spinors are constructed, given this formalism. Given a real vector space V of dimension n = 2m an even number, its complexification is $V \otimes \mathbf{C}$. It can be written as the direct sum of a subspace $W$ of spinors and a subspace $\overline{W}$ of anti-spinors:

$$V \otimes \mathbf{C} = W \oplus \overline{W}$$

The space $W$ is spanned by the spinors $\eta_k = \left( e_{2k-1} - ie_{2k} \right) / \sqrt 2$ for $1\le k\le m$ and the complex conjugate spinors span $\overline{W}$. It is straightforward to see that the spinors anti-commute, and that the product of a spinor and anti-spinor is a scalar.

The spinor space is defined as the exterior algebra $\textstyle{\bigwedge} W$. The (complexified) Clifford algebra acts naturally on this space; the (complexified) spin group corresponds to the length-preserving endomorphisms. There is a natural grading on the exterior algebra: the product of an odd number of copies of $W$ correspond to the physics notion of fermions; the even subspace corresponds to the bosons. The representations of the action of the spin group on the spinor space can be built in a relatively straightforward fashion.

== Complex case ==
The Spin^{C} group is defined by the exact sequence

$$1 \to \mathrm{Z}_2 \to \operatorname{Spin}^{\mathbf{C}}(n) \to \operatorname{SO}(n)\times \operatorname{U}(1) \to 1.$$

It is a multiplicative subgroup of the complexification $\operatorname{Cl}(V)\otimes \mathbf{C}$ of the Clifford algebra, and specifically, it is the subgroup generated by Spin(V) and the unit circle in C. Alternately, it is the quotient

$$\operatorname{Spin}^{\mathbf{C}}(V) = \left( \operatorname{Spin}(V) \times S^1 \right) / \sim$$

where the equivalence $\sim$ identifies (a, u) with (−a, −u).

This has important applications in 4-manifold theory and Seiberg–Witten theory. In physics, the Spin group is appropriate for describing uncharged fermions, while the Spin^{C} group is used to describe electrically charged fermions. In this case, the U(1) symmetry is specifically the gauge group (structure group) of electromagnetism.

== Exceptional isomorphisms ==
In low dimensions, there are isomorphisms among the classical Lie groups called exceptional isomorphisms. For instance, there are isomorphisms between low-dimensional spin groups and certain classical Lie groups, owing to low-dimensional isomorphisms between the root systems (and corresponding isomorphisms of Dynkin diagrams) of the different families of simple Lie algebras. Writing R for the reals, C for the complex numbers, H for the quaternions and the general understanding that Cl(n) is a short-hand for Cl(R^{n}) and that Spin(n) is a short-hand for Spin(R^{n}) and so on, one then has that

Clifford Algebras and Spin Groups
$\operatorname{\text{Cl}}^{even}(n)$	$\operatorname{\text{Pin}}(n)$	$\operatorname{\text{Spin}}(n)$	Dimension
$\mathbb{R}$ (the real numbers)	{+i, −i, +1, −1}	O(1) = {+1, −1}	0
$\mathbb{C}$ (the complex numbers)		U(1) = SO(2), which acts on $\mathbb{R}^2$ by double phase rotation $z \mapsto u^2z$. Corresponds to the abelian $D_1$.	1
$\mathbb{H}$ (the quaternions)		Sp(1) = SU(2), corresponding to $B_1 \cong C_1 \cong A_1$.	3
$\mathbb{H} \oplus \mathbb{H}$		SU(2) × SU(2), corresponding to $D_2 \cong A_1 \times A_1$.	6
$M(2,\mathbb{H})$ (the two-by-two matrices with quaternionic coefficients)		Sp(2), corresponding to $B_2 \cong C_2$.	10
$M(4,\mathbb{C})$ (the four-by-four matrices with complex coefficients)		SU(4), corresponding to $D_3 \cong A_3$.	15

There are certain vestiges of these isomorphisms left over for n = 7, 8 (see Spin(8) for more details). For higher n, these isomorphisms disappear entirely.

== Indefinite signature ==
In indefinite signature, the spin group $\text{Spin}(p, q)$ is constructed through Clifford algebras in a similar way to standard spin groups. It is a double cover of $\text{SO}_0(p, q)$, the connected component of the identity of the indefinite orthogonal group $\text{SO}(p, q)$. For $p + q > 2$, $\text{Spin}(p, q)$ is connected; for $(p, q) = (1,1)$, there are two connected components.

As in definite signature, there are some accidental isomorphisms in low dimensions:

Accidental Isomorphisms
$\text{Spin}(p, q)$	1	2	3
1	$\text{GL}(1, \mathbb{R})$		
2	$\text{SL}(2, \mathbb{R})$	$\text{SL}(2, \mathbb{R}) \times \text{SL}(2, \mathbb{R})$	
3	$\text{SL}(2, \mathbb{C})$	$\text{Sp}(4, \mathbb{R})$	$\text{SL}(4, \mathbb{R})$
4	$\text{Sp}(1,1)$	$\text{SU}(2,2)$	
5	$\text{SL}(2, \mathbb{H})$		
6		$\text{SU}(2,2, \mathbb{H})$	

Note that $\text{Spin}(p, q) = \text{Spin}(q, p)$.

== Topological considerations ==
Connected and simply connected Lie groups are classified by their Lie algebra. So if G is a connected Lie group with a simple Lie algebra, with G′ the universal cover of G, there is an inclusion

$$\pi_1 (G) \subset \operatorname{Z}(G'),$$

with Z(G′) the center of G′. This inclusion and the Lie algebra $\mathfrak{g}$ of G determine G entirely (note that it is not the case that $\mathfrak{g}$ and π_{1}(G) determine G entirely; for instance SL(2, R) and PSL(2, R) have the same Lie algebra and same fundamental group Z, but are not isomorphic).

The definite signature Spin(n) are all simply connected for n > 2, so they are the universal coverings of SO(n).

In indefinite signature, Spin(p, q) is not necessarily connected, and in general the identity component, Spin_{0}(p, q), is not simply connected, thus it is not a universal cover. The fundamental group is most easily understood by considering the maximal compact subgroup of SO(p, q), which is SO(p) × SO(q), and noting that rather than being the product of the 2-fold covers (hence a 4-fold cover), Spin(p, q) is the "diagonal" 2-fold cover – it is a 2-fold quotient of the 4-fold cover. Explicitly, the maximal compact connected subgroup of Spin(p, q) is

Spin(p) × Spin(q)/{(1, 1), (−1, −1)}.

This allows us to calculate the fundamental groups of SO(p, q), taking p ≥ q:

$$\pi_1(\mbox{SO}(p,q)) = \begin{cases}
0 & (p,q)=(1,1) \mbox{ or } (1,0) \\
\mathbb{Z}_2 & p > 2, q = 0,1 \\
\mathbb{Z} & (p,q)=(2,0) \mbox{ or } (2,1) \\
\mathbb{Z} \times \mathbb{Z} & (p,q) = (2,2) \\
\mathbb{Z} \times \mathbb{Z}_2 & p > 2, q=2 \\
\mathbb{Z}_2 \times \mathbb{Z}_2 & p, q >2\\
\end{cases}$$

Thus once p, q > 2 the fundamental group is Z_{2}, as it is a 2-fold quotient of a product of two universal covers.

The maps on fundamental groups are given as follows. For p, q > 2, this implies that the map π_{1}(Spin(p, q)) → π_{1}(SO(p, q)) is given by 1 ∈ Z_{2} going to (1, 1) ∈ Z_{2} × Z_{2}. For p = 2, q > 2, this map is given by 1 ∈ Z → (1,1) ∈ Z × Z_{2}. And finally, for p = q = 2, (1, 0) ∈ Z × Z is sent to (1,1) ∈ Z × Z and (0, 1) is sent to (1, −1).

=== Fundamental groups of SO(n) ===
The fundamental groups $\pi_1(\operatorname{\text{SO}}(n))$ can be more directly derived using results in homotopy theory. In particular we can find $\pi_1(\operatorname{\text{SO}}(n))$ for $n > 3$ as the three smallest have familiar underlying manifolds: $\operatorname{\text{SO}}(1)$ is the point manifold, $\operatorname{\text{SO}}(2) \cong S^1$, and $\operatorname{\text{SO}}(3) \cong \mathbb{RP}^3$ (shown using the axis-angle representation).

The proof uses known results in algebraic topology.

Proof

First consider the action of $\operatorname{SO}(n)$ on $\mathbb{R}^n$, in particular on the vector $v = (1, 0, \cdots, 0)$. The orbit of this vector is $\text{Orbit}_{\text{SO}(n)}(v) = S^{n-1}$, while the stabilizer is $\text{Stab}_{\text{SO}(n)}(v) = \text{SO}(n-1)$. Thus from the orbit-stabilizer theorem one obtains an isomorphism
$$\text{SO}(n)/\text{SO}(n-1) \cong S^{n-1}.$$

Geometrically, this provides a fibration
$$\text{SO}(n-1) \rightarrow \text{SO}(n) \rightarrow S^{n-1}.$$

Then Theorem 4.41 in Hatcher tells us that there is a long exact sequence of homotopy groups

$$\cdots \rightarrow \pi_k(\text{SO}(n-1)) \rightarrow \pi_k(\text{SO}(n)) \rightarrow \pi_k(S^{n-1}) \rightarrow \pi_{k-1}(\text{SO}(n-1)) \rightarrow \cdots$$

and we concentrate on a section at the end of the sequence:
$$\pi_2(S^{n-1}) \rightarrow \pi_1(\text{SO}(n-1))\rightarrow \pi_1(\text{SO}(n)) \rightarrow \pi_1(S^{n-1}).$$

Corollary 4.9 in Hatcher states $\pi_k(S^n) = 0$ for $k < n$. So for $n > 3$, the exact sequence becomes
$$0 \rightarrow \pi_1(\text{SO}(n-1))\rightarrow \pi_1(\text{SO}(n)) \rightarrow 0,$$
hence $\pi_1(\text{SO}(n))$ and $\pi_1(\text{SO}(n-1))$ are isomorphic as long as $n > 3$, so for $n > 3$, we have $\pi_1(\text{SO}(n)) \cong \pi_1(\text{SO}(3))$.

And since $\text{SO}(3) \cong \mathbb{RP}^3 \cong S^3 / \{\pm 1\}$, we get $\pi_1(\text{SO}(3)) \cong \mathbb{Z}_2$.

The same argument can be used to show $\pi(\text{SO}(1,n)^\uparrow) \cong \pi(\text{SO}(n))$, by considering a fibration
$$\text{SO}(n) \rightarrow \text{SO}(1,n)^\uparrow \rightarrow H^n,$$
where $H^n$ is the upper sheet of a two-sheeted hyperboloid, which is contractible, and $\text{SO}(1,n)^\uparrow$ is the identity component of the proper Lorentz group (the proper orthochronous Lorentz group).

== Center ==
The center of the spin groups, for n ≥ 3, (complex and real) are given as follows:

$$\begin{align}
\operatorname{Z}(\operatorname{Spin}(n,\mathbf{C})) &= \begin{cases}
\mathrm{Z}_2 & n = 2k+1\\
\mathrm{Z}_4 & n = 4k+2\\
\mathrm{Z}_2 \oplus \mathrm{Z}_2 & n = 4k\\
\end{cases} \\
\operatorname{Z}(\operatorname{Spin}(p,q)) &= \begin{cases}
\mathrm{Z}_2 & p \text{ or } q \text{ odd}\\
\mathrm{Z}_4 & n = 4k+2, \text{ and } p, q \text{ even}\\
\mathrm{Z}_2 \oplus \mathrm{Z}_2 & n = 4k, \text{ and } p, q \text{ even}\\
\end{cases}
\end{align}$$

== Quotient groups ==
Quotient groups can be obtained from a spin group by quotienting out by a subgroup of the center, with the spin group then being a covering group of the resulting quotient, and both groups having the same Lie algebra.

Quotienting out by the entire center yields the minimal such group, the projective special orthogonal group, which is centerless, while quotienting out by {±1} yields the special orthogonal group – if the center equals {±1} (namely in odd dimension), these two quotient groups agree. If the spin group is simply connected (as Spin(n) is for n > 2), then Spin is the maximal group in the sequence, and one has a sequence of three groups,

Spin(n) → SO(n) → PSO(n),

splitting by parity yields:

Spin(2n) → SO(2n) → PSO(2n),
Spin(2n+1) → SO(2n+1) = PSO(2n+1),

which are the three compact real forms (or two, if SO = PSO) of the compact Lie algebra $\mathfrak{so} (n, \mathbf{R}).$

The homotopy groups of the cover and the quotient are related by the long exact sequence of a fibration, with discrete fiber (the fiber being the kernel) – thus all homotopy groups for k > 1 are equal, but π_{0} and π_{1} may differ.

For n > 2, Spin(n) is simply connected (π_{0} = π_{1} = Z_{1} is trivial), so SO(n) is connected and has fundamental group Z_{2} while PSO(n) is connected and has fundamental group equal to the center of Spin(n).

In indefinite signature the covers and homotopy groups are more complicated – Spin(p, q) is not simply connected, and quotienting also affects connected components. The analysis is simpler if one considers the maximal (connected) compact SO(p) × SO(q) ⊂ SO(p, q) and the component group of Spin(p, q).

== Whitehead tower ==
The spin group appears in a Whitehead tower anchored by the orthogonal group:

$$\ldots\rightarrow \text{Fivebrane}(n) \rightarrow \text{String}(n)\rightarrow \text{Spin}(n)\rightarrow \text{SO}(n) \rightarrow \text{O}(n)$$

The tower is obtained by successively removing (killing) homotopy groups of increasing order. This is done by constructing short exact sequences starting with an Eilenberg–MacLane space for the homotopy group to be removed. Killing the π_{3} homotopy group in Spin(n), one obtains the infinite-dimensional string group String(n).

== Discrete subgroups ==
Discrete subgroups of the spin group can be understood by relating them to discrete subgroups of the special orthogonal group (rotational point groups).

Given the double cover Spin(n) → SO(n), by the lattice theorem, there is a Galois connection between subgroups of Spin(n) and subgroups of SO(n) (rotational point groups): the image of a subgroup of Spin(n) is a rotational point group, and the preimage of a point group is a subgroup of Spin(n), and the closure operator on subgroups of Spin(n) is multiplication by {±1}. These may be called "binary point groups"; most familiar is the 3-dimensional case, known as binary polyhedral groups.

Concretely, every binary point group is either the preimage of a point group (hence denoted 2G, for the point group G), or is an index 2 subgroup of the preimage of a point group which maps (isomorphically) onto the point group; in the latter case the full binary group is abstractly $\mathrm{C}_2 \times G$ (since {±1} is central). As an example of these latter, given a cyclic group of odd order $\mathrm{Z}_{2k+1}$ in SO(n), its preimage is a cyclic group of twice the order, $\mathrm{C}_{4k+2} \cong \mathrm{Z}_{2k+1} \times \mathrm{Z}_2,$ and the subgroup Z_{2k+1} < Spin(n) maps isomorphically to Z_{2k+1} < SO(n).

Of particular note are two series:

- higher binary tetrahedral groups, corresponding to the 2-fold cover of symmetries of the n-simplex; this group can also be considered as the double cover of the symmetric group, 2⋅A_{n} → A_{n}, with the alternating group being the (rotational) symmetry group of the n-simplex.
- higher binary octahedral groups, corresponding to the 2-fold covers of the hyperoctahedral group (symmetries of the hypercube, or equivalently of its dual, the cross-polytope).

For point groups that reverse orientation, the situation is more complicated, as there are two pin groups, so there are two possible binary groups corresponding to a given point group.

== See also ==
- Clifford algebra
- Clifford analysis
- Spinor
- Spinor bundle
- Spin structure
- Table of Lie groups
- Anyon
- Orientation entanglement

=== Related groups ===
- Pin group Pin(n) – two-fold cover of orthogonal group, O(n)
- Metaplectic group Mp(2n) – two-fold cover of symplectic group, Sp(2n)
- String group String(n) – the next group in the Whitehead tower
