= Covering group =

Concept in topological group theory

In mathematics, a covering group of a topological group H is a covering space G of H such that G is a topological group and the covering map p : G → H is a continuous group homomorphism. The map p is called the covering homomorphism. A frequently occurring case is a double covering group, a topological double cover in which the kernel of p has order two; examples include the spin groups, pin groups, and metaplectic groups.

Roughly explained, saying that for example the metaplectic group Mp_{2n} is a double cover of the symplectic group Sp_{2n} means that there are always two elements in the metaplectic group representing one element in the symplectic group.

== Properties ==
Let G be a covering group of H. The kernel K of the covering homomorphism is just the fiber over the identity in H and is a discrete normal subgroup of G. The kernel K is closed in G if and only if G is Hausdorff (and if and only if H is Hausdorff). Going in the other direction, if G is any topological group and K is a discrete normal subgroup of G then the quotient map p : G → G / K is a covering homomorphism.

If G is connected then K, being a discrete normal subgroup, necessarily lies in the center of G and is therefore abelian. In this case, the center of H = G / K is given by

$$\mathrm{Z}(H) \cong \mathrm{Z}(G)/K .$$

As with all covering spaces, the fundamental group of G injects into the fundamental group of H. Since the fundamental group of a topological group is always abelian, every covering group is a normal covering space. In particular, if G is path-connected then the quotient group π_{1}(H) / π_{1}(G) is isomorphic to K. The group K acts simply transitively on the fibers (which are just left cosets) by right multiplication. The group G is then a principal K-bundle over H.

If G is a covering group of H then the groups G and H are locally isomorphic. Moreover, given any two connected locally isomorphic groups H_{1} and H_{2}, there exists a topological group G with discrete normal subgroups K_{1} and K_{2} such that H_{1} is isomorphic to G / K_{1} and H_{2} is isomorphic to G / K_{2}.

== Group structure on a covering space ==
Let H be a topological group and let G be a covering space of H. If G and H are both path-connected and locally path-connected, then for any choice of element e* in the fiber over e ∈ H, there exists a unique topological group structure on G, with e* as the identity, for which the covering map p : G → H is a homomorphism.

The construction is as follows. Let a and b be elements of G and let f and g be paths in G starting at e* and terminating at a and b respectively. Define a path h : I → H by h(t) = p(f(t))p(g(t)). By the path-lifting property of covering spaces there is a unique lift of h to G with initial point e*. The product ab is defined as the endpoint of this path. By construction we have p(ab) = p(a)p(b). One must show that this definition is independent of the choice of paths f and g, and also that the group operations are continuous.

Alternatively, the group law on G can be constructed by lifting the group law H × H → H to G, using the lifting property of the covering map G × G → H × H.

The non-connected case is interesting and is studied in the papers by Taylor and by Brown-Mucuk cited below. Essentially there is an obstruction to the existence of a universal cover that is also a topological group such that the covering map is a morphism: this obstruction lies in the third cohomology group of the group of components of G with coefficients in the fundamental group of G at the identity.

== Universal covering group ==
If H is a path-connected, locally path-connected, and semilocally simply connected group then it has a universal cover. By the previous construction the universal cover can be made into a topological group with the covering map a continuous homomorphism. This group is called the universal covering group of H. There is also a more direct construction, which we give below.

Let PH be the path group of H. That is, PH is the space of paths in H based at the identity together with the compact-open topology. The product of paths is given by pointwise multiplication, i.e. (fg)(t) = f(t)g(t). This gives PH the structure of a topological group. There is a natural group homomorphism PH → H that sends each path to its endpoint. The universal cover of H is given as the quotient of PH by the normal subgroup of null-homotopic loops. The projection PH → H descends to the quotient giving the covering map. One can show that the universal cover is simply connected and the kernel is just the fundamental group of H. That is, we have a short exact sequence

$$1\to \pi_1(H) \to \tilde H \to H \to 1$$

where is the universal cover of H. Concretely, the universal covering group of H is the space of homotopy classes of paths in H with pointwise multiplication of paths. The covering map sends each path class to its endpoint.

== Lattice of covering groups ==
As the above suggest, if a group has a universal covering group (if it is path-connected, locally path-connected, and semilocally simply connected), with discrete center, then the set of all topological groups that are covered by the universal covering group form a lattice, corresponding to the lattice of subgroups of the center of the universal covering group: inclusion of subgroups corresponds to covering of quotient groups. The maximal element is the universal covering group, while the minimal element is the universal covering group mod its center, / Z.

This corresponds algebraically to the universal perfect central extension (called "covering group", by analogy) as the maximal element, and a group mod its center as minimal element.

This is particularly important for Lie groups, as these groups are all the (connected) realizations of a particular Lie algebra. For many Lie groups the center is the group of scalar matrices, and thus the group mod its center is the projectivization of the Lie group. These covers are important in studying projective representations of Lie groups, and spin representations lead to the discovery of spin groups: a projective representation of a Lie group need not come from a linear representation of the group, but does come from a linear representation of some covering group, in particular the universal covering group. The finite analog led to the covering group or Schur cover, as discussed above.

A key example arises from SL_{2}(R), which has center {±1} and fundamental group Z. It is a double cover of the centerless projective special linear group PSL_{2}(R), which is obtained by taking the quotient by the center. By Iwasawa decomposition, both groups are circle bundles over the complex upper half-plane, and their universal cover ${\mathrm{S}\widetilde{\mathrm{L}_2(}\mathbf{R})}$ is a real line bundle over the half-plane that forms one of Thurston's eight geometries. Since the half-plane is contractible, all bundle structures are trivial. The preimage of SL_{2}(Z) in the universal cover is isomorphic to the braid group on three strands.

== Lie groups ==
The above definitions and constructions all apply to the special case of Lie groups. In particular, every covering of a manifold is a manifold, and the covering homomorphism becomes a smooth map. Likewise, given any discrete normal subgroup of a Lie group the quotient group is a Lie group and the quotient map is a covering homomorphism.

Two Lie groups are locally isomorphic if and only if their Lie algebras are isomorphic. This implies that a homomorphism φ : G → H of Lie groups is a covering homomorphism if and only if the induced map on Lie algebras

$$\phi_* : \mathfrak g \to \mathfrak h$$

is an isomorphism.

Since for every Lie algebra $\mathfrak g$ there is a unique simply connected Lie group G with Lie algebra $\mathfrak g$, from this follows that the universal covering group of a connected Lie group H is the (unique) simply connected Lie group G having the same Lie algebra as H.

== Examples ==
- The universal covering group of the circle group T is the additive group of real numbers (R, +) with the covering homomorphism given by the mapping R → T : x ↦ exp(2πix). The kernel of this mapping is isomorphic to Z.
- For any integer n we have a covering group of the circle by itself T → T that sends z to z^{n}. The kernel of this homomorphism is the cyclic group consisting of the nth roots of unity.
- The rotation group SO(3) has as a universal cover the group SU(2), which is isomorphic to the group of versors in the quaternions. This is a double cover since the kernel has order 2. (cf the tangloids.)
- The unitary group U(n) is covered by the compact group T × SU(n) with the covering homomorphism given by p(z, A) = zA. The universal cover is R × SU(n).
- The special orthogonal group SO(n) has a double cover called the spin group Spin(n). For n ≥ 3, the spin group is the universal cover of SO(n).
- For n ≥ 2, the universal cover of the special linear group SL(n, R) is not a matrix group (i.e. it has no faithful finite-dimensional representations).
