= Icosian =

Specific set of Hamiltonian quaternions with the same symmetry as the 600-cell

In mathematics, the icosians are a specific set of Hamiltonian quaternions with the same symmetry as the 600-cell. The term can be used to refer to two related, but distinct, concepts:

- The icosian group: a multiplicative group of 120 quaternions, positioned at the vertices of a 600-cell of unit radius. This group is isomorphic to the binary icosahedral group of order 120.
- The icosian ring: all finite sums of the 120 unit icosians.

== Unit icosians ==
The icosian group, consisting of the 120 unit icosians, comprises the distinct even permutations of

- ½(±2, 0, 0, 0) (resulting in 8 icosians),
- ½(±1, ±1, ±1, ±1) (resulting in 16 icosians),
- ½(0, ±1, ±1/φ, ±φ) (resulting in 96 icosians).

In this case, the vector (a, b, c, d) refers to the quaternion a + bi + cj + dk, and φ represents the golden ratio (√5 + 1)/2. These 120 vectors form the vertices of a 600-cell, whose symmetry group is the Coxeter group H4 of order 14400. In addition, the 600 icosians of norm 2 form the vertices of a 120-cell. Other subgroups of icosians correspond to the tesseract, 16-cell and 24-cell.

== Icosian ring ==
The icosians are a subset of quaternions of the form, (a + b√5) + (c + d√5)i + (e + f√5)j + (g + h√5)k, where the eight variables are rational numbers. (Note: The complex numbers of the form a + b√5 , where a and b are both rational, are sometimes referred to as the golden field owing to their connection with the golden ratio.). This quaternion is only an icosian if the vector (a, b, c, d, e, f, g, h) is a point on a lattice L, which is isomorphic to an E8 lattice.

More precisely, the quaternion norm of the above element is (a + b√5)^{2} + (c + d√5)^{2} + (e + f√5)^{2} + (g + h√5)^{2}. Its Euclidean norm is defined as u + v if the quaternion norm is u + v√5. This Euclidean norm defines a quadratic form on L, under which the lattice is isomorphic to the E8 lattice.

This construction shows that the Coxeter group $H_4$ embeds as a subgroup of $E_8$. Indeed, a linear isomorphism that preserves the quaternion norm also preserves the Euclidean norm.
