= Quaternion group =

Non-abelian group of order eight

Quaternion group multiplication table (simplified form)
	1	i	j	k
1	1	i	j	k
i	i	−1	k	−j
j	j	−k	−1	i
k	k	j	−i	−1

Cycle diagram of Q_{8}. Each color specifies a series of powers of any element connected to the identity element e = 1. For example, the cycle in red reflects the fact that i^{2} = e̅, i^{3} = i̅ and i^{4} = e. The red cycle also reflects that i̅^{2} = e̅, i̅^{3} = i and i̅^{4} = e.

In group theory, the quaternion group Q_{8} (sometimes just denoted by Q) is a non-abelian group of order eight, isomorphic to the eight-element subset $\{1,i,j,k,-1,-i,-j,-k\}$ of the quaternions under multiplication. It is given by the group presentation

$$\mathrm{Q}_8 = \langle \bar{e},i,j,k \mid \bar{e}^2 = e, \;i^2 = j^2 = k^2 = ijk = \bar{e} \rangle ,$$

where e is the identity element and e̅ commutes with the other elements of the group. These relations, discovered by W. R. Hamilton, also generate the quaternions as an algebra over the real numbers.

Another presentation of Q_{8} is

$$\mathrm{Q}_8 = \langle a,b \mid a^4 = e, a^2 = b^2, ba = a^{-1}b\rangle.$$

Like many other finite groups, it can be realized as the Galois group of a certain field of algebraic numbers.

== Compared to dihedral group ==
The quaternion group Q_{8} has the same order as the dihedral group D_{4}, but a different structure, as shown by their Cayley and cycle graphs:

	Q_{8}	D_{4}
Cayley graph	Red arrows connect g→gi, green connect g→gj.	
Cycle graph		

In the diagrams for D_{4}, the group elements are marked with their action on a letter F in the defining representation R^{2}. The same cannot be done for Q_{8}, since it has no faithful representation in R^{2} or R^{3}. D_{4} can be realized as a subset of the split-quaternions in the same way that Q_{8} can be viewed as a subset of the quaternions.

== Cayley table ==
The Cayley table (multiplication table) for Q_{8} is given by:

×	e	e̅	i	i̅	j	j̅	k	k̅
e	e	e̅	i	i̅	j	j̅	k	k̅
e̅	e̅	e	i̅	i	j̅	j	k̅	k
i	i	i̅	e̅	e	k	k̅	j̅	j
i̅	i̅	i	e	e̅	k̅	k	j	j̅
j	j	j̅	k̅	k	e̅	e	i	i̅
j̅	j̅	j	k	k̅	e	e̅	i̅	i
k	k	k̅	j	j̅	i̅	i	e̅	e
k̅	k̅	k	j̅	j	i	i̅	e	e̅

== Properties ==
The elements i, j, and k all have order four in Q_{8} and any two of them generate the entire group. Another presentation of Q_{8} based in only two elements to skip this redundancy is:

$$\left \langle x,y \mid x^4 = 1, x^2 = y^2, y^{-1}xy = x^{-1} \right \rangle.$$

This presentation is still redundant, since the relation $x^4 = 1$ is implied by the other two relations, and may be dropped. The quaternion group has also a shorter presentation with two generators and two relations

$$\left \langle x,y \mid x^2 = y^2, xyx = y \right \rangle.$$

For instance, writing the group elements in lexicographically minimal normal forms, one may identify:

$\{e, \bar e, i, \bar{i}, j, \bar{j}, k, \bar{k}\} \leftrightarrow \{e, x^2, x, x^3, y, x^2 y, xy, x^3 y \}.$

The quaternion group has the unusual property of being Hamiltonian: Q_{8} is non-abelian, but every subgroup is normal. Every Hamiltonian group contains a copy of Q_{8}.

The quaternion group Q_{8} and the dihedral group D_{4} are the two smallest examples of a nilpotent non-abelian group.

The center and the commutator subgroup of Q_{8} is the subgroup $\{e,\bar{e}\}$. The inner automorphism group of Q_{8} is given by the group modulo its center, i.e. the factor group $\mathrm{Q}_8/\{e,\bar{e}\},$ which is isomorphic to the Klein four-group V. The full automorphism group of Q_{8} is isomorphic to S_{4}, the symmetric group on four letters (see Matrix representations below), and the outer automorphism group of Q_{8} is thus S_{4}/V, which is isomorphic to S_{3}.

The quaternion group Q_{8} has five conjugacy classes, $\{e\}, \{\bar{e}\}, \{i,\bar{i}\}, \{j,\bar{j}\}, \{k,\bar{k}\},$ and so five irreducible representations over the complex numbers, with dimensions 1, 1, 1, 1, 2:

Trivial representation.

Sign representations with i, j, k-kernel: Q_{8} has three maximal normal subgroups: the cyclic subgroups generated by i, j, and k respectively. For each maximal normal subgroup N, we obtain a one-dimensional representation factoring through the 2-element quotient group G/N. The representation sends elements of N to 1, and elements outside N to −1.

2-dimensional representation: Described below in Matrix representations. It is not realizable over the real numbers, but is a complex representation: indeed, it is just the quaternions $\mathbb{H}$ considered as an algebra over $\mathbb C$, and the action is that of left multiplication by $Q_8\subset \mathbb H$.

The character table of Q_{8} turns out to be the same as that of D_{4}:

Representation(ρ)/Conjugacy class	{ e }	{ e̅ }	{ i, i̅ }	{ j, j̅ }	{ k, k̅ }
Trivial representation	1	1	1	1	1
Sign representation with i-kernel	1	1	1	−1	−1
Sign representation with j-kernel	1	1	−1	1	−1
Sign representation with k-kernel	1	1	−1	−1	1
2-dimensional representation	2	−2	0	0	0

Nevertheless, all the irreducible characters $\chi_\rho$ in the rows above have real values, this gives the decomposition of the real group algebra of $G = \mathrm{Q}_8$ into minimal two-sided ideals:

$$\R[\mathrm{Q}_8]=\bigoplus_\rho (e_\rho),$$

where the idempotents $e_\rho\in \R[\mathrm{Q}_8]$ correspond to the irreducibles:

$$e_\rho = \frac{\dim(\rho)}{|G|}\sum_{g\in G} \chi_\rho(g^{-1})g,$$

so that

$$\begin{align}
e_{\text{triv}} &= \tfrac 18(e + \bar e + i +\bar i+j+\bar j+k+\bar k) \\
e_{i\text{-ker}} &= \tfrac 18(e + \bar e + i +\bar i-j-\bar j-k-\bar k) \\
e_{j\text{-ker}} &= \tfrac 18(e + \bar e - i -\bar i+j+\bar j-k-\bar k) \\
e_{k\text{-ker}} &= \tfrac 18(e + \bar e - i -\bar i-j-\bar j+k+\bar k) \\
e_{2} &= \tfrac 28(2e - 2\bar e) = \tfrac 12(e - \bar e)
\end{align}$$

Each of these irreducible ideals is isomorphic to a real central simple algebra, the first four to the real field $\R$. The last ideal $(e_2)$ is isomorphic to the skew field of quaternions $\mathbb{H}$ by the correspondence:

$$\begin{align}
\tfrac12(e-\bar e) &\longleftrightarrow 1, \\
\tfrac12(i-\bar i) &\longleftrightarrow i, \\
\tfrac12(j-\bar j) &\longleftrightarrow j, \\
\tfrac12(k-\bar k) &\longleftrightarrow k.
\end{align}$$

Furthermore, the projection homomorphism $\R[\mathrm{Q}_8]\to (e_2)\cong \mathbb{H}$ given by $r\mapsto re_2$ has kernel ideal generated by the idempotent:

$$e_2^\perp = e_1+e_{i\text{-ker}}+e_{j\text{-ker}}+e_{k\text{-ker}} =
\tfrac{1}{2}(e+\bar e),$$

so the quaternions can also be obtained as the quotient ring $\R[\mathrm{Q}_8]/(e+\bar e)\cong \mathbb H$. Note that this is irreducible as a real representation of $Q_8$, but splits into two copies of the two-dimensional irreducible when extended to the complex numbers. Indeed, the complex group algebra is $\C[\mathrm{Q}_8] \cong \C^{\oplus 4} \oplus M_2(\C),$ where $M_2(\C) \cong \mathbb{H} \otimes_{\R} \C$ is the algebra of biquaternions.

== Matrix representations ==
Multiplication table of quaternion group as a subgroup of SL(2,C). The entries are represented by sectors corresponding to their arguments: 1 (green), i (blue), −1 (red), −i (yellow).

The two-dimensional irreducible complex representation described above gives the quaternion group Q_{8} as a subgroup of the general linear group $\operatorname{GL}(2, \C)$. The quaternion group is a multiplicative subgroup of the quaternion algebra:

$$\H = \R 1 + \R i + \R j + \R k= 1 \C+ j \C ,$$

which has a regular representation $\rho:\H \to \operatorname{M}(2, \C)$ by left multiplication on itself considered as a right complex vector space with basis $\{1,j\},$ so that $z \in \H$ corresponds to the $\C$-linear mapping $\rho_z: a + jb \mapsto z\cdot(a + jb).$ The resulting representation

$$\begin{cases} \rho:\mathrm{Q}_8 \to \operatorname{GL}(2,\C)\\ g\longmapsto\rho_g \end{cases}$$

is given by:

$$\begin{matrix}
e \mapsto \begin{pmatrix}
1 &          0 \\
0 &          1
\end{pmatrix} &
i \mapsto \begin{pmatrix}
i &          0 \\
0 & \!\!\!\!-i
\end{pmatrix}&
j \mapsto \begin{pmatrix}
0 & \!\!\!\!-1 \\
1 &          0
\end{pmatrix}&
k \mapsto \begin{pmatrix}
0 & \!\!\!\!-i \\
\!\!\!-i &          0
\end{pmatrix} \\
\overline{e} \mapsto \begin{pmatrix}
\!\!\!-1 &          0 \\
0 & \!\!\!\!-1
\end{pmatrix} &
\overline{i} \mapsto \begin{pmatrix}
\!\!\!-i &          0 \\
0 &          i
\end{pmatrix}&
\overline{j} \mapsto \begin{pmatrix}
0 &          1 \\
\!\!\!-1 &          0
\end{pmatrix}&
\overline{k} \mapsto \begin{pmatrix}
0 &          i \\
i &          0
\end{pmatrix}.
\end{matrix}$$

Since all of the above matrices have unit determinant, this is a representation of Q_{8} in the special linear group $\operatorname{SL}(2,\C)$.

A variant gives a representation by unitary matrices (table at right). Let $g\in \mathrm{Q}_8$ correspond to the linear mapping $\rho_g:a+bj\mapsto (a + bj)\cdot jg^{-1}j^{-1},$ so that $\rho:\mathrm{Q}_8 \to \operatorname{SU}(2)$ is given by:

$$\begin{matrix}
e \mapsto \begin{pmatrix}
1 &          0 \\
0 &          1
\end{pmatrix} &
i \mapsto \begin{pmatrix}
i &          0 \\
0 & \!\!\!\!-i
\end{pmatrix}&
j \mapsto \begin{pmatrix}
0 &          1 \\
\!\!\!-1 &          0
\end{pmatrix}&
k \mapsto \begin{pmatrix}
0 &          i \\
i &          0
\end{pmatrix} \\
\overline{e} \mapsto \begin{pmatrix}
\!\!\!-1 &          0 \\
0 & \!\!\!\!-1
\end{pmatrix} &
\overline{i} \mapsto \begin{pmatrix}
\!\!\!-i &          0 \\
0 &          i
\end{pmatrix}&
\overline{j} \mapsto \begin{pmatrix}
0 & \!\!\!\!-1 \\
1 &          0
\end{pmatrix}&
\overline{k} \mapsto \begin{pmatrix}
0 & \!\!\!\!-i \\
\!\!\!-i &          0
\end{pmatrix}.
\end{matrix}$$

It is worth noting that physicists exclusively use a different convention for the $\operatorname{SU}(2)$ matrix representation to make contact with the usual Pauli matrices:

$$\begin{matrix}
&e \mapsto \begin{pmatrix}
1 &          0 \\
0 &          1
\end{pmatrix} = \quad\, 1_{2\times2}
&i \mapsto \begin{pmatrix}
0 &          \!\!\!-i\! \\
\!\!-i\!\! &          0
\end{pmatrix} = -i \sigma_x
&j \mapsto \begin{pmatrix}
0 &          \!\!\!-1\! \\
1 &           0
\end{pmatrix} = -i \sigma_y
&k \mapsto \begin{pmatrix}
\!\!-i\!\! &          0 \\
0 &          i
\end{pmatrix} = -i \sigma_z\\
&\overline{e} \mapsto \begin{pmatrix}
\!\!-1\! &          0 \\
0 & \!\!\!-1\!
\end{pmatrix} = -1_{2\times2}
&\overline{i} \mapsto \begin{pmatrix}
0 &          i \\
i &          0
\end{pmatrix} = \,\,\,\, i \sigma_x
&\overline{j} \mapsto \begin{pmatrix}
0 &          1 \\
\!\!-1\!\! &          0
\end{pmatrix} = \,\,\,\, i \sigma_y
&\overline{k} \mapsto \begin{pmatrix}
i &           0 \\
0 &          \!\!\!-i\!
\end{pmatrix} = \,\,\,\, i \sigma_z.
\end{matrix}$$

This particular choice is convenient and elegant when one describes spin-1/2 states in the $(\vec{J}^2, J_z)$ basis and considers angular momentum ladder operators $J_{\pm} = J_x \pm iJ_y.$

Multiplication table of the quaternion group as a subgroup of SL(2,3). The field elements are denoted 0, +, −.

There is also an important action of Q_{8} on the 2-dimensional vector space over the finite field $\mathbb{F}_3 =\{0, 1, -1\}$ (table at right). A modular representation $\rho: \mathrm{Q}_8 \to \operatorname{SL}(2, 3)$ is given by

$$\begin{matrix}
e \mapsto \begin{pmatrix}
1 &          0 \\
0 &          1
\end{pmatrix} &
i \mapsto \begin{pmatrix}
1 &          1 \\
1 & \!\!\!\!-1
\end{pmatrix} &
j \mapsto \begin{pmatrix}
\!\!\!-1 &          1 \\
1 &          1
\end{pmatrix} &
k \mapsto \begin{pmatrix}
0 & \!\!\!\!-1 \\
1 &          0
\end{pmatrix} \\
\overline{e} \mapsto \begin{pmatrix}
\!\!\!-1 &          0 \\
0 & \!\!\!\!-1
\end{pmatrix} &
\overline{i} \mapsto \begin{pmatrix}
\!\!\!-1 & \!\!\!\!-1 \\
\!\!\!-1 &          1
\end{pmatrix} &
\overline{j} \mapsto \begin{pmatrix}
1 & \!\!\!\!-1 \\
\!\!\!-1 & \!\!\!\!-1
\end{pmatrix} &
\overline{k} \mapsto \begin{pmatrix}
0 &          1 \\
\!\!\!-1 &          0
\end{pmatrix}.
\end{matrix}$$

This representation can be obtained from the extension field:

$$\mathbb{F}_9 = \mathbb{F}_3 [k] = \mathbb{F}_3 1 + \mathbb{F}_3 k,$$

where $k^2=-1$ and the multiplicative group $\mathbb{F}_9^{\times}$ has four generators, $\pm(k\pm1),$ of order 8. For each $z \in \mathbb{F}_9,$ the two-dimensional $\mathbb{F}_3$-vector space $\mathbb{F}_9$ admits a linear mapping:

$$\begin{cases} \mu_z: \mathbb{F}_9 \to \mathbb{F}_9 \\ \mu_z(a+bk)=z\cdot(a+bk) \end{cases}$$

In addition we have the Frobenius automorphism $\phi(a+bk)=(a+bk)^3$ satisfying $\phi^2 = \mu_1$ and $\phi\mu_z = \mu_{\phi(z)}\phi.$ Then the above representation matrices are:

$$\begin{align}
\rho(\bar e) &=\mu_{-1}, \\
\rho(i) &=\mu_{k+1}\phi, \\
\rho(j)&=\mu_{k-1} \phi, \\
\rho(k)&=\mu_{k}.
\end{align}$$

This representation realizes Q_{8} as a normal subgroup of GL(2, 3). Thus, for each matrix $m\in \operatorname{GL}(2,3)$, we have a group automorphism

$$\begin{cases} \psi_m:\mathrm{Q}_8\to\mathrm{Q}_8 \\ \psi_m(g)=mgm^{-1} \end{cases}$$

with $\psi_I =\psi_{-I}=\mathrm{id}_{\mathrm{Q}_8}.$ In fact, these give the full automorphism group as:

$$\operatorname{Aut}(\mathrm{Q}_8) \cong \operatorname{PGL}(2, 3) = \operatorname{GL}(2,3)/\{\pm I\}\cong S_4.$$

This is isomorphic to the symmetric group S_{4} since the linear mappings $m:\mathbb{F}_3^2 \to \mathbb{F}_3^2$ permute the four one-dimensional subspaces of $\mathbb{F}_3^2,$ i.e., the four points of the projective space $\mathbb{P}^1 (\mathbb{F}_3) = \operatorname{PG}(1,3).$

Also, this representation permutes the eight non-zero vectors of $\mathbb{F}_3^2,$ giving an embedding of Q_{8} in the symmetric group S_{8}, in addition to the embeddings given by the regular representations.

== Galois group ==
Richard Dedekind considered the field $\mathbb{Q}(\sqrt{2}, \sqrt{3})$ in attempting to relate the quaternion group to Galois theory. In 1936 Ernst Witt published his approach to the quaternion group through Galois theory.

In 1981, Richard Dean showed the quaternion group can be realized as the Galois group Gal(T/Q) where Q is the field of rational numbers and T is the splitting field of the polynomial

$$x^8 - 72 x^6 + 180 x^4 - 144 x^2 + 36$$.

The development uses the fundamental theorem of Galois theory in specifying four intermediate fields between Q and T and their Galois groups, as well as two theorems on cyclic extension of degree four over a field.

== Generalized quaternion group ==
A generalized quaternion group Q_{4n} of order 4n is defined by the presentation

$$\langle x,y \mid x^{2n} = y^4 = 1, x^n = y^2, y^{-1}xy = x^{-1}\rangle$$

for an integer n ≥ 2, with the usual quaternion group given by n = 2. Coxeter calls Q_{4n} the dicyclic group $\langle 2, 2, n\rangle$, a special case of the binary polyhedral group $\langle \ell, m, n\rangle$ and related to the polyhedral group $(p,q,r)$ and the dihedral group $(2,2,n)$. The generalized quaternion group can be realized as the subgroup of $\operatorname{GL}_2(\Complex)$ generated by

$$\left(\begin{array}{cc}
\omega_n & 0 \\
0 & \overline{\omega}_n
\end{array}
\right)
\mbox{ and }
\left(\begin{array}{cc}
0 & -1 \\
1 & 0
\end{array}
\right)$$

where $\omega_n = e^{i\pi/n}$. It can also be realized as the subgroup of unit quaternions generated by $x=e^{i\pi/n}$ and $y=j$.

The generalized quaternion groups have the property that every abelian subgroup is cyclic. It can be shown that a finite p-group with this property (every abelian subgroup is cyclic) is either cyclic or a generalized quaternion group as defined above. Another characterization is that a finite p-group in which there is a unique subgroup of order p is either cyclic or a 2-group isomorphic to generalized quaternion group. In particular, for a finite field F with odd characteristic, the 2-Sylow subgroup of SL_{2}(F) is non-abelian and has only one subgroup of order 2, so this 2-Sylow subgroup must be a generalized quaternion group, (Gorenstein 1980, p. 42). Letting p^{r} be the size of F, where p is prime, the size of the 2-Sylow subgroup of SL_{2}(F) is 2^{n}, where n = ord_{2}(p^{2} − 1) + ord_{2}(r).

The Brauer–Suzuki theorem shows that the groups whose Sylow 2-subgroups are generalized quaternion cannot be simple.

Another terminology reserves the name "generalized quaternion group" for a dicyclic group of order a power of 2, which admits the presentation

$$\langle x,y \mid x^{2^m} = y^4 = 1, x^{2^{m-1}} = y^2, y^{-1}xy = x^{-1}\rangle.$$

== See also ==
- 16-cell (whose vertices correspond to the elements of the quaternion group)
- Binary tetrahedral group
- Clifford algebra
- Dicyclic group
- Hurwitz integral quaternion
- List of small groups
