= Binary tetrahedral group =

Group of order 24, double cover of the tetrahedral rotation group

The 24 elements of the binary tetrahedral group, in a projection from four-dimensional space with 12-fold symmetry

In mathematics, the binary tetrahedral group, denoted 2T or ⟨2,3,3⟩, is a nonabelian group of order 24 that describes the 12 rotational symmetries of a regular tetrahedron in a "doubled" form. As in all binary polyhedral groups, a rotation by an angle θ is distinguished from the rotation by θ + 360° about the same axis, and only a rotation by 720° counts as the identity (compare the plate trick). Each of the 12 rotations of the tetrahedral group T thus corresponds to two elements of 2T.

Concretely, 2T consists of the 24 units of the Hurwitz quaternions, ±1, ±i, ±j, ±k, and 1/2(±1 ± i ± j ± k). Through the identification of the unit quaternions with SU(2) and with the spin group Spin(3), it is the preimage of T under the two-to-one covering homomorphism Spin(3) → SO(3) (see quaternions and spatial rotation). As an abstract group, 2T is isomorphic to the special linear group SL(2,3). Its 24 elements are the vertices of a regular 24-cell.

== Elements ==
Cayley graph of SL(2,3)

Symmetry projection
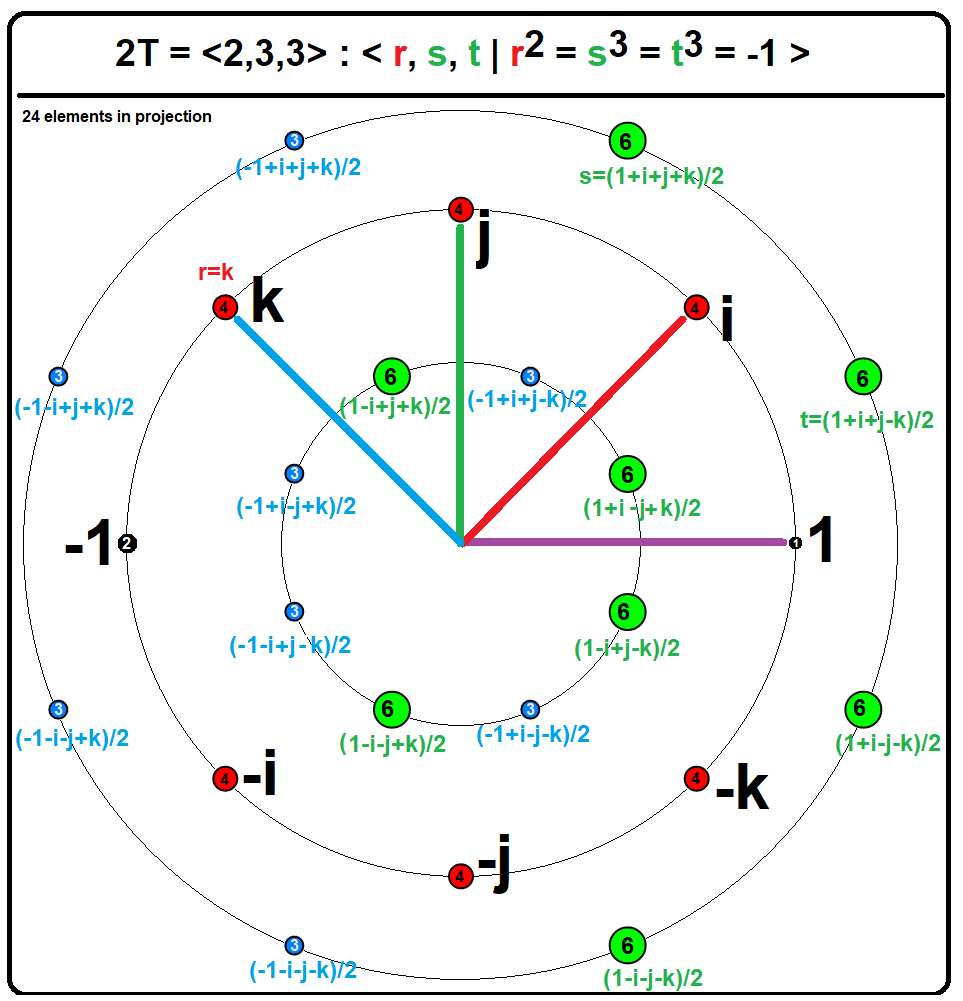
8-fold

24 quaternion elements:

- 1 order-1: 1
- 1 order-2: −1
- 6 order-4: ±i, ±j, ±k
- 8 order-6: (+1 ± i ± j ± k)/2
- 8 order-3: (−1 ± i ± j ± k)/2.

Explicitly, the binary tetrahedral group is given as the group of units in the ring of Hurwitz integers. There are 24 such units given by

$$\{\pm 1,\pm i,\pm j,\pm k,\tfrac{1}{2}(\pm 1 \pm i \pm j \pm k)\}$$

with all possible sign combinations.

All 24 units have absolute value 1 and therefore lie in the unit quaternion group Sp(1). The convex hull of these 24 elements in 4-dimensional space form a convex regular 4-polytope called the 24-cell.

== Properties ==
The binary tetrahedral group, denoted by 2T, fits into the short exact sequence

$$1\to\{\pm 1\}\to 2\mathrm{T}\to \mathrm{T} \to 1.$$

This sequence does not split, meaning that 2T is not a semidirect product of {±1} by T. In fact, there is no subgroup of 2T isomorphic to T.

The binary tetrahedral group is the Schur cover (double cover) of the tetrahedral group, viewed as the alternating group T ≅ A_{4}. It is isomorphic to the special linear group SL(2,3) – the group of all 2 × 2 matrices over the finite field F_{3} with unit determinant – and this isomorphism covers the isomorphism of the projective special linear group PSL(2,3) with A_{4}.

The center of 2T is the subgroup {±1}. The inner automorphism group is isomorphic to A_{4}, and the full automorphism group is isomorphic to S_{4}.

Left multiplication by −ω, an order-6 element: look at gray, blue, purple, and orange balls and arrows that constitute 4 orbits (two arrows are not depicted). ω itself is the bottommost ball: ω = (−ω)(−1) = (−ω)^{4}

The binary tetrahedral group can be written as a semidirect product

$$2\mathrm{T}=\mathrm{Q}\rtimes\mathrm{C}_3$$

where Q is the quaternion group consisting of the 8 Lipschitz units and C_{3} is the cyclic group of order 3 generated by ω = −1/2(1 + i + j + k). The group C_{3} acts on the normal subgroup Q by conjugation. Conjugation by ω is the automorphism of Q that cyclically rotates i, j, and k.

The regular complex polytope, 3{6}2 or or, represents the Cayley diagram for the binary tetrahedral group, with each red and blue triangle a directed subgraph.

The binary tetrahedral group is isomorphic to the complex reflection group named 3(24)3 by G.C. Shephard, or 3[3]3 and by Coxeter.

=== Presentation ===
The group 2T has a presentation given by

$$\langle r,s,t \mid r^2 = s^3 = t^3 = rst \rangle$$

or equivalently,

$\langle s,t \mid (st)^2 = s^3 = t^3 \rangle.$

Generators with these relations are given by

$$r = i \qquad s = \tfrac{1}{2}(1+i+j+k) \qquad t = \tfrac{1}{2}(1+i-j+k),$$

with $r^2 = s^3 = t^3 = -1$.

=== Subgroups ===
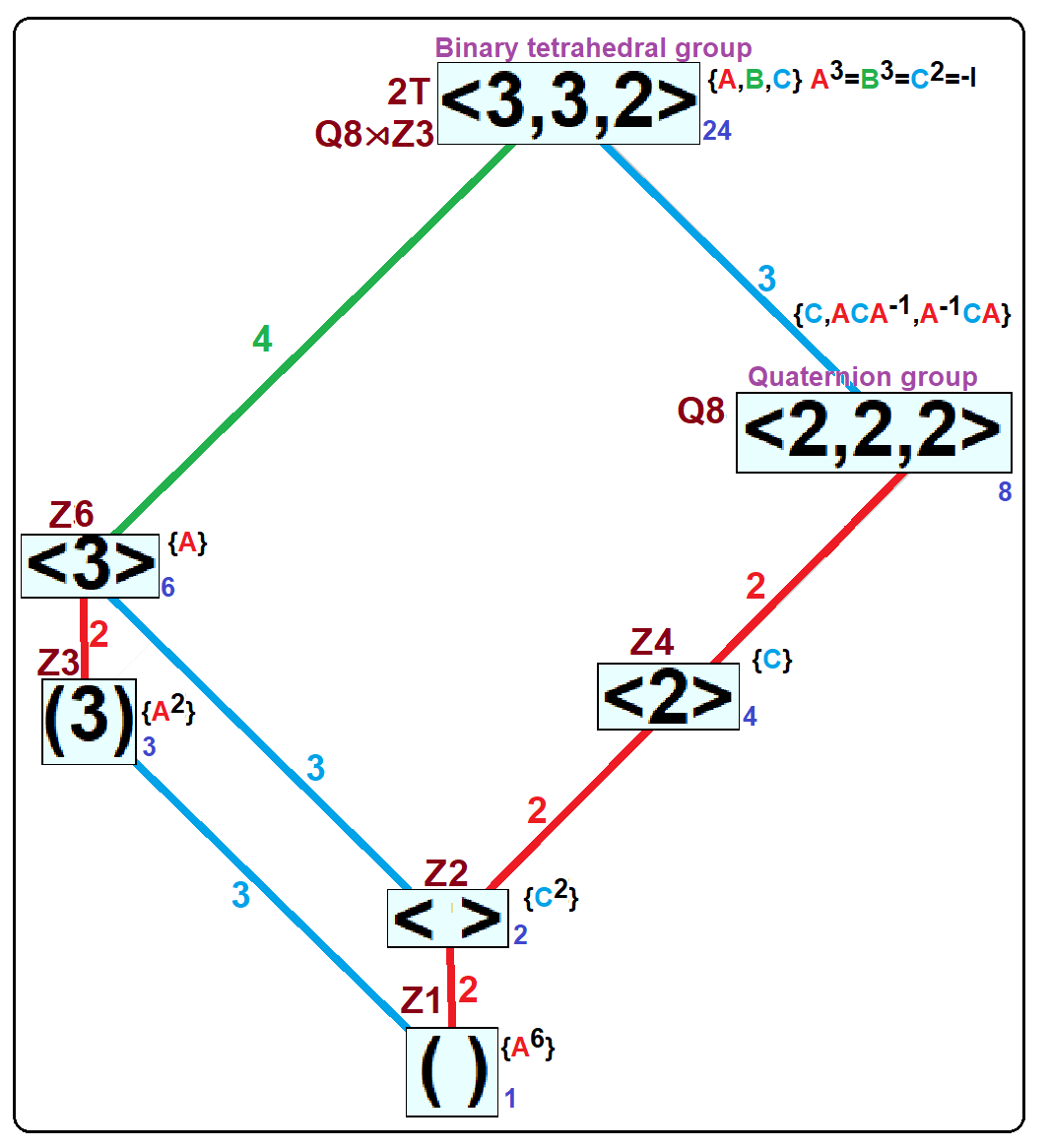
The binary tetrahedral group, 2T = ⟨2,3,3⟩, has 2 primary subgroups: • Quaternion group, Q = ⟨2,2,2⟩, index 3 • Cyclic group Z_{6} = ⟨3⟩, index 4.

The quaternion group consisting of the 8 Lipschitz units forms a normal subgroup of 2T of index 3. This group and the center {±1} are the only proper nontrivial normal subgroups.

All other subgroups of 2T are cyclic groups generated by the various elements, with orders 3, 4, and 6.

== Higher dimensions ==
Just as the tetrahedral group is the rotational symmetry group of the 3-simplex, the rotational symmetry group of the n-simplex is the alternating group A_{n+1}, and its preimage under Spin(n) → SO(n) is a double cover of A_{n+1}; see covering groups of the alternating and symmetric groups.

== Usage in theoretical physics ==
In physics and chemistry, 2T is the double group of the tetrahedral point group T. The binary tetrahedral group was used in a study of the isotopic spin of strange particles in 1956 by Chen Ning Yang and others. In flavor physics, where it is known as T′ (T-prime), it was first used in model building by Paul Frampton and Thomas Kephart in 1994.
