= Non-abelian group =

Group where ab = ba does not always hold

In mathematics, and specifically in group theory, a non-abelian group, sometimes called a non-commutative group, is a group (G, ∗) in which there exists at least one pair of elements a and b of G, such that a ∗ b ≠ b ∗ a. This class of groups contrasts with the abelian groups, where all pairs of group elements commute.

Non-abelian groups are pervasive in mathematics and physics. One of the simplest examples of a non-abelian group is the dihedral group of order 6. It is the smallest finite non-abelian group. A common example from physics is the rotation group SO(3) in three dimensions (for example, rotating something 90 degrees along one axis and then 90 degrees along a different axis is not the same as doing them in reverse order).

Both discrete groups and continuous groups may be non-abelian.

Many nonabelian groups are exhibited as a group of units of a ring. For example, the commutator satisfies the anticommutative property. When the commutator is used with the vector space T of tangents at 1 of the group of units of the ring, there is an algebraic structure (T +, o ) ( o = commutator, often square brackets). The algebra T is non-associative and is called the Lie algebra of the group.

The property ab + ba = 0 (anticommutativity) can be used selectively, as in quaternion algebras. Over a given field, these are four-dimensional and with a multiplicative unit 1. In a basis {1, i, j, k}, the first dimension commutes with the others, but they do not commute with each other, rather, they anti-commute. These four generate a group of order 8, which may be the quaternion group or the dihedral group of order 8.

== See also ==
- Associative algebra
- Noncommutative geometry
- Niels Henrik Abel
