= Center (group theory) =

Set of elements that commute with every element of a group

Cayley table for D_{4} showing elements of the center, {e, a^{2}}, commute with all other elements (this can be seen by noticing that all occurrences of a given center element are arranged symmetrically about the center diagonal or by noticing that the row and column starting with a given center element are transposes of each other).
$\circ$	e	b	a	a^{2}	a^{3}	ab	a^{2}b	a^{3}b
e	e	b	a	a^{2}	a^{3}	ab	a^{2}b	a^{3}b
b	b	e	a^{3}b	a^{2}b	ab	a^{3}	a^{2}	a
a	a	ab	a^{2}	a^{3}	e	a^{2}b	a^{3}b	b
a^{2}	a^{2}	a^{2}b	a^{3}	e	a	a^{3}b	b	ab
a^{3}	a^{3}	a^{3}b	e	a	a^{2}	b	ab	a^{2}b
ab	ab	a	b	a^{3}b	a^{2}b	e	a^{3}	a^{2}
a^{2}b	a^{2}b	a^{2}	ab	b	a^{3}b	a	e	a^{3}
a^{3}b	a^{3}b	a^{3}	a^{2}b	ab	b	a^{2}	a	e

In abstract algebra, the center of a group G is the set of elements that commute with every element of G. It is denoted Z(G), from German Zentrum, meaning center. In set-builder notation,

Z(G) = {z ∈ G | ∀g ∈ G, zg = gz}.

The center is a normal subgroup, $Z(G)\triangleleft G$, and also a characteristic subgroup, but is not necessarily fully characteristic. The quotient group, G / Z(G), is isomorphic to the inner automorphism group, Inn(G).

A group G is abelian if and only if Z(G) = G. At the other extreme, a group is said to be centerless if Z(G) is trivial; i.e., consists only of the identity element.

The elements of the center are central elements.

== As a subgroup ==
The center of G is always a subgroup of G. In particular:

1. Z(G) contains the identity element of G, because it commutes with every element of g, by definition: eg = g = ge, where e is the identity;
2. If x and y are in Z(G), then so is xy, by associativity: (xy)g = x(yg) = x(gy) = (xg)y = (gx)y = g(xy) for each g ∈ G; i.e., Z(G) is closed;
3. If x is in Z(G), then so is x^{−1} as, for all g in G, x^{−1} commutes with g: (gx = xg) ⇒ (x^{−1}gxx^{−1} = x^{−1}xgx^{−1}) ⇒ (x^{−1}g = gx^{−1}).

Furthermore, the center of G is always an abelian and normal subgroup of G. Since all elements of Z(G) commute, it is closed under conjugation.

A group homomorphism f : G → H might not restrict to a homomorphism between their centers. The image elements f (g) commute with the image f ( G ), but they need not commute with all of H unless f is surjective. Thus the center mapping $G\to Z(G)$ is not a functor between categories Grp and Ab, since it does not induce a map of arrows.

== Conjugacy classes and centralizers ==
By definition, an element is central whenever its conjugacy class contains only the element itself; i.e. Cl(g) = {g}.

The center is the intersection of all the centralizers of elements of G:

$Z(G) = \bigcap_{g\in G} Z_G(g).$

As centralizers are subgroups, this again shows that the center is a subgroup.

== Conjugation ==
Consider the map f : G → Aut(G), from G to the automorphism group of G defined by f(g) = ϕ_{g}, where ϕ_{g} is the automorphism of G defined by

f(g)(h) = ϕ_{g}(h) = ghg^{−1}.

The function, f is a group homomorphism, and its kernel is precisely the center of G, and its image is called the inner automorphism group of G, denoted Inn(G). By the first isomorphism theorem we get,

G/Z(G) ≃ Inn(G).

The cokernel of this map is the group Out(G) of outer automorphisms, and these form the exact sequence

1 ⟶ Z(G) ⟶ G ⟶ Aut(G) ⟶ Out(G) ⟶ 1.

== Examples ==
- The center of an abelian group, G, is all of G.
- The center of the Heisenberg group, H, is the set of matrices of the form:
  $$\begin{pmatrix}
1 & 0 & z\\
0 & 1 & 0\\
0 & 0 & 1
\end{pmatrix}$$
- The center of a nonabelian simple group is trivial.
- The center of the dihedral group, D_{n}, is trivial for odd n ≥ 3. For even n ≥ 4, the center consists of the identity element together with the 180° rotation of the polygon.
- The center of the quaternion group, Q_{8} = {1, −1, i, −i, j, −j, k, −k}, is {1, −1}.
- The center of the symmetric group, S_{n}, is trivial for n ≥ 3.
- The center of the alternating group, A_{n}, is trivial for n ≥ 4.
- The center of the general linear group over a field F, GL_{n}(F), is the collection of scalar matrices, { sI_{n} ∣ s ∈ F \ {0} }.
- The center of the orthogonal group, O_{n}(F) is {I_{n}, −I_{n}}.
- The center of the special orthogonal group, SO(n) is the whole group when n = 2, and otherwise {I_{n}, −I_{n}} when n is even, and trivial when n is odd.
- The center of the unitary group, $U(n)$ is $\left\{ e^{i\theta} \cdot I_n \mid \theta \in [0, 2\pi) \right\}$.
- The center of the special unitary group, $\operatorname{SU}(n)$ is $\left\lbrace e^{i\theta} \cdot I_n \mid \theta = \frac{2k\pi}{n}, k = 0, 1, \dots, n-1 \right\rbrace$.
- The center of the multiplicative group of non-zero quaternions is the multiplicative group of non-zero real numbers.
- Using the class equation, one can prove that the center of any non-trivial finite p-group is non-trivial.
- If the quotient group G/Z(G) is cyclic, G is abelian (and hence G = Z(G), so G/Z(G) is trivial).
- The center of the Rubik's Cube group consists of two elements – the identity (i.e. the solved state) and the superflip. The center of the Pocket Cube group is trivial.
- The center of the Megaminx group has order 2, and the center of the Kilominx group is trivial.

== Higher centers ==
Quotienting out by the center of a group yields a sequence of groups called the upper central series:

(G_{0} = G) ⟶ (G_{1} = G_{0}/Z(G_{0})) ⟶ (G_{2} = G_{1}/Z(G_{1})) ⟶ ⋯

The kernel of the map G → G_{i} is the ith center of G (second center, third center, etc.), denoted Z^{i}(G). Concretely, the (i+1)-st center comprises the elements that commute with all elements up to an element of the ith center. Following this definition, one can define the 0th center of a group to be the identity subgroup. This can be continued to transfinite ordinals by transfinite induction; the union of all the higher centers is called the hypercenter. (Note: This union will include transfinite terms if the UCS does not stabilize at a finite stage.)

The ascending chain of subgroups

1 ≤ Z(G) ≤ Z^{2}(G) ≤ ⋯

stabilizes at i (equivalently, Z^{i}(G) = Z^{i+1}(G)) if and only if G_{i} is centerless.

=== Examples ===
- For a centerless group, all higher centers are zero, which is the case Z^{0}(G) = Z^{1}(G) of stabilization.
- By Grün's lemma, the quotient of a perfect group by its center is centerless, hence all higher centers equal the center. This is a case of stabilization at Z^{1}(G) = Z^{2}(G).

== See also ==
- Center (algebra)
- Center (ring theory)
- Centralizer and normalizer
- Conjugacy class
