= Four-dimensional space =

Geometric space with four dimensions

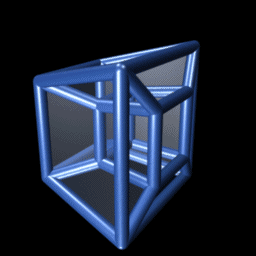
The 4D equivalent of a cube is known as a tesseract, seen rotating here in four-dimensional space, yet projected into two dimensions for display.

Four-dimensional (4D) space is the mathematical extension of the concept of three-dimensional space (3D). Three-dimensional space is the simplest possible abstraction of the observation that one needs only three numbers, called dimensions, to describe the sizes or locations of objects in the everyday world. This concept of ordinary space is called Euclidean space because it corresponds to Euclid's geometry, which was originally abstracted from the spatial experiences of everyday life.

Single locations in Euclidean 4D space can be given as vectors or 4-tuples, i.e., as ordered lists of numbers such as (x, y, z, w). For example, the volume of a rectangular box is found by measuring and multiplying its length, width, and height (often labeled as x, y, and z). It is only when such locations are linked together into more complicated shapes that the full richness and geometric complexity of 4D spaces emerge. A hint of that complexity can be seen in the accompanying 2D animation of one of the simplest possible regular 4D objects, the tesseract, which is analogous to the 3D cube.

== History ==
The idea of making time the fourth dimension began with Jean le Rond d'Alembert's "Dimensions," published in 1754 in the Encyclopédie, ou dictionnaire raisonné des sciences, des arts et des métiers. That physical mechanics can be viewed as occurring also in time was posited by Joseph-Louis Lagrange in 1755 and published in 1788 in his Mécanique analytique.

Mathematics of 4D commenced in the nineteenth century. That 3D form rotation onto its mirror-image is possible in 4D space was realized by August Ferdinand Möbius in Der barycentrische Calcul published 1827. An arithmetic of four spatial dimensions, called quaternions, was defined by William Rowan Hamilton in 1843. Soon after, tessarines and coquaternions were introduced as other four-dimensional algebras over R. Higher-dimensional non-Euclidean spaces were put on a firm footing by Bernhard Riemann's 1854 thesis, Über die Hypothesen welche der Geometrie zu Grunde liegen, in which he considered a "point" to be any sequence of coordinates (x_{1}, ..., x_{n}).

Euclidean spaces of more than three dimensions were first described in 1852, when Ludwig Schläfli generalized Euclidean geometry to spaces of dimension n, using both synthetic and algebraic methods. He discovered all of the regular polytopes (higher-dimensional analogues of the Platonic solids) that exist in Euclidean spaces of any dimension, including six found in 4-dimensional space. Schläfli's work was only published posthumously in 1901, and remained largely unknown until publication of H.S.M. Coxeter's Regular Polytopes in 1947. During that interval many others also discovered higher-dimensional Euclidean space. One of the first popular expositors of the fourth dimension was Charles Howard Hinton, starting in 1880 with his essay "What is the Fourth Dimension?", published in the Dublin University magazine, in which he explained the concept of a "four-dimensional cube" with a step-by-step generalization of the properties of lines, squares, and cubes. (Note: The simplest form of Hinton's method is to draw two ordinary 3D cubes in 2D space, one encompassing the other, separated by an "unseen" distance, and then draw lines between their equivalent vertices. This can be seen in the accompanying animation whenever it shows a smaller inner cube inside a larger outer cube. The eight lines connecting the vertices of the two cubes in this case represent a single direction in the "unseen" fourth dimension.) He coined the terms tesseract, ana and kata in his book A New Era of Thought and introduced a method for visualizing the fourth dimension using cubes in the book Fourth Dimension. 1886, Victor Schlegel described his method of visualizing four-dimensional objects with Schlegel diagrams.

Hermann Minkowski's 1908 paper consolidating the role of time as the fourth dimension of spacetime provided the geometric basis for Einstein's theories of special and general relativity. The geometry of spacetime, being non-Euclidean, is profoundly different from that explored by Schläfli and popularised by Hinton. Hinton's ideas inspired a fantasy about a "Church of the Fourth Dimension" featured by Martin Gardner in his January 1962 "Mathematical Games column" in Scientific American. 1967, The associative algebra of W R Hamilton was the source of the science of vector analysis in three dimensions as recounted by Michael J. Crowe in A History of Vector Analysis. The study of Minkowski space required Riemann's mathematics which is quite different from that of four-dimensional Euclidean space, and so developed along quite different lines. This separation was less clear in the popular imagination, with works of fiction and philosophy blurring the distinction, so in 1973 H. S. M. Coxeter felt compelled to write:

Little, if anything, is gained by representing the fourth Euclidean dimension as time. In fact, this idea, so attractively developed by H. G. Wells in The Time Machine, has led such authors as John William Dunne (An Experiment with Time) into a serious misconception of the theory of Relativity. Minkowski's geometry of space-time is not Euclidean, and consequently has no connection with the present investigation.

— H. S. M. Coxeter, Regular Polytopes

== Vectors ==
Mathematically, a four-dimensional space is a space that needs four parameters to specify a point in it. For example, a general point might have position vector a, equal to

$$\mathbf{a} = \begin{pmatrix} a_1 \\ a_2 \\ a_3 \\ a_4 \end{pmatrix}.$$

This can be written in terms of the four standard basis vectors (e_{1}, e_{2}, e_{3}, e_{4}), given by

$$\mathbf{e}_1 = \begin{pmatrix} 1 \\ 0 \\ 0 \\ 0 \end{pmatrix}; \mathbf{e}_2 = \begin{pmatrix} 0 \\ 1 \\ 0 \\ 0 \end{pmatrix}; \mathbf{e}_3 = \begin{pmatrix} 0 \\ 0 \\ 1 \\ 0 \end{pmatrix}; \mathbf{e}_4 = \begin{pmatrix} 0 \\ 0 \\ 0 \\ 1 \end{pmatrix},$$

so the general vector a is

$$\mathbf{a} = a_1\mathbf{e}_1 + a_2\mathbf{e}_2 + a_3\mathbf{e}_3 + a_4\mathbf{e}_4.$$

Vectors add, subtract and scale as in three dimensions.

The dot product of Euclidean three-dimensional space generalizes to four dimensions as

$$\mathbf{a} \cdot \mathbf{b} = a_1 b_1 + a_2 b_2 + a_3 b_3 + a_4 b_4.$$

It can be used to calculate the norm or length of a vector,

$$\left| \mathbf{a} \right| = \sqrt{\mathbf{a} \cdot \mathbf{a} } = \sqrt{a_1^2 + a_2^2 + a_3^2 + a_4^2},$$

and calculate or define the angle between two non-zero vectors as

$$\theta = \arccos{\frac{\mathbf{a} \cdot \mathbf{b}}{\left|\mathbf{a}\right| \left|\mathbf{b}\right|}}.$$

Minkowski spacetime is four-dimensional space with geometry defined by a non-degenerate pairing different from the dot product:

$$\mathbf{a} \cdot \mathbf{b} = a_1 b_1 + a_2 b_2 + a_3 b_3 - a_4 b_4.$$

As an example, the distance squared between the points (0,0,0,0) and (1,1,1,0) is 3 in both the Euclidean and Minkowskian 4-spaces, while the distance squared between (0,0,0,0) and (1,1,1,1) is 4 in Euclidean space and 2 in Minkowski space; increasing b_{4} decreases the metric distance. This leads to many of the well-known apparent "paradoxes" of relativity.

The cross product is not defined in four dimensions. Instead, it is often generalized using either the exterior product or the determinant method of cross product calculation, which both work in any dimension and conincide with the cross product in three dimensions. The exterior product method is defined as follows:

$$\begin{align}
\mathbf{a} \wedge \mathbf{b} = (a_1b_2 - a_2b_1)\mathbf{e}_{12} + (a_1b_3 - a_3b_1)\mathbf{e}_{13} + (a_1b_4 - a_4b_1)\mathbf{e}_{14} + (a_2b_3 - a_3b_2)\mathbf{e}_{23} \\
+ (a_2b_4 - a_4b_2)\mathbf{e}_{24} + (a_3b_4 - a_4b_3)\mathbf{e}_{34}. \end{align}$$

This is bivector valued, with bivectors in four dimensions forming a six-dimensional linear space with basis (e_{12}, e_{13}, e_{14}, e_{23}, e_{24}, e_{34}). Bivectors can be used to generate rotations in four dimensions which is why the exterior product is typically chosen as the generalization of the cross product when rotations are important. The determinant method is defined similarly to the three-dimensional case as follows:
$$\mathbf{\times(a, b, c)} = \begin{vmatrix}
\mathbf{i}&\mathbf{j}&\mathbf{k}&\mathbf{l}\\
a_1 & a_2 & a_3 & a_4\\
b_1 & b_2 & b_3 & b_4\\
c_1 & c_2 & c_3 & c_4\\
\end{vmatrix}$$
When expanded this gives a vector over the basis (i, j, k, l), which can simply be interpreted as a normal vector. This method is chosen when orthogonal vectors are important. Unlike in three-dimensional space it takes three vectors as input to produce a fourth orthgonal vector.

== Orthogonality and vocabulary ==
In the familiar three-dimensional space of daily life, there are three coordinate axes—usually labeled x, y, and z—with each axis orthogonal (i.e. perpendicular) to the other two. The six cardinal directions in this space can be called up, down, east, west, north, and south. Positions along these axes can be called altitude, longitude, and latitude. Lengths measured along these axes can be called height, width, and depth.

Comparatively, four-dimensional space has an extra coordinate axis, orthogonal to the other three, which is usually labeled w. To describe the two additional cardinal directions, Charles Howard Hinton coined the terms ana and kata, from the Greek words meaning "up toward" and "down from", respectively.

As mentioned, Hermann Minkowski exploited the idea of four dimensions to discuss cosmology including the finite velocity of light. In appending a time dimension to three-dimensional space, he specified an alternative perpendicularity, hyperbolic orthogonality. This notion provides his four-dimensional space with a modified simultaneity appropriate to electromagnetic relations in his cosmos. Minkowski's world overcame problems associated with the traditional absolute space and time cosmology previously used in a universe of three space dimensions and one time dimension.

== Geometry ==
The geometry of four-dimensional space is much more complex than that of three-dimensional space, due to the extra degree of freedom.

Just as in three dimensions there are polyhedra made of two dimensional polygons, in four dimensions there are polychora made of polyhedra. In three dimensions, there are 5 regular polyhedra known as the Platonic solids. In four dimensions, there are 6 convex regular 4-polytopes, the analogs of the Platonic solids. Relaxing the conditions for regularity generates a further 58 convex uniform 4-polytopes, analogous to the 13 semi-regular Archimedean solids in three dimensions. Relaxing the conditions for convexity generates a further 10 nonconvex regular 4-polytopes.

Regular polytopes in four dimensions (Displayed as orthogonal projections in each Coxeter plane of symmetry)
A_{4}, [3,3,3]	B_{4}, [4,3,3]		F_{4}, [3,4,3]	H_{4}, [5,3,3]	
5-cell {3,3,3}	tesseract {4,3,3}	16-cell {3,3,4}	24-cell {3,4,3}	600-cell {3,3,5}	120-cell {5,3,3}

In three dimensions, a circle may be extruded to form a cylinder. In four dimensions, there are several different cylinder-like objects. A sphere may be extruded to obtain a spherical cylinder (a cylinder with spherical "caps", known as a spherinder), and a cylinder may be extruded to obtain a cylindrical prism (a cubinder). The Cartesian product of two circles may be taken to obtain a duocylinder. All three can "roll" in four-dimensional space, each with its properties.

In three dimensions, curves can form knots but surfaces cannot (unless they are self-intersecting). In four dimensions, however, knots made using curves can be trivially untied by displacing them in the fourth direction—but 2D surfaces can form non-trivial, non-self-intersecting knots in 4D space. Because these surfaces are two-dimensional, they can form much more complex knots than strings in 3D space can. The Klein bottle is an example of such a knotted surface. Another such surface is the real projective plane.

=== Hypersphere ===
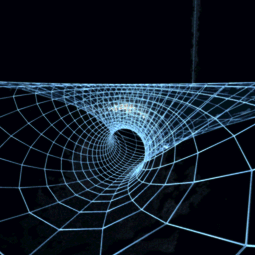
Stereographic projection of a Clifford torus: the set of points (cos(a), sin(a), cos(b), sin(b)), which is a subset of the 3-sphere.

The set of points in Euclidean 4-space having the same distance R from a fixed point P_{0} forms a hypersurface known as a 3-sphere. The hyper-volume of the enclosed space is:

$$\mathbf V = \begin{matrix} \frac{1}{2} \end{matrix} \pi^2 R^4$$

This is part of the Friedmann–Lemaître–Robertson–Walker metric in General relativity where R is substituted by function R(t) with t meaning the cosmological age of the universe. Growing or shrinking R with time means expanding or collapsing universe, depending on the mass density inside.

== Four-dimensional perception in humans ==
Research using virtual reality finds that humans, despite living in a three-dimensional world, can, without special practice, make spatial judgments about line segments embedded in four-dimensional space, based on their length (one-dimensional) and the angle (two-dimensional) between them. The researchers noted that "the participants in our study had minimal practice in these tasks, and it remains an open question whether it is possible to obtain more sustainable, definitive, and richer 4D representations with increased perceptual experience in 4D virtual environments". In another study, the ability of humans to orient themselves in 2D, 3D, and 4D mazes has been tested. Each maze consisted of four path segments of random length and connected with orthogonal random bends, but without branches or loops (i.e. actually labyrinths). The graphical interface was based on John McIntosh's free 4D Maze game. The participating persons had to navigate through the path and finally estimate the linear direction back to the starting point. The researchers found that some of the participants were able to mentally integrate their path after some practice in 4D (the lower-dimensional cases were for comparison and for the participants to learn the method).

However, a 2020 review underlined how these studies are composed of a small subject sample and mainly of college students. It also pointed out other issues that future research has to resolve: elimination of artifacts (these could be caused, for example, by strategies to resolve the required task that don't use 4D representation/4D reasoning and feedback given by researchers to speed up the adaptation process) and analysis on inter-subject variability (if 4D perception is possible, its acquisition could be limited to a subset of humans, to a specific critical period, or to people's attention or motivation). Furthermore, it is undetermined if there is a more appropriate way to project the 4-dimension (because there are no restrictions on how the 4-dimension can be projected). Researchers also hypothesized that human acquisition of 4D perception could result in the activation of brain visual areas and entorhinal cortex. If so they suggest that it could be used as a strong indicator of 4D space perception acquisition. Authors also suggested using a variety of different neural network architectures (with different a priori assumptions) to understand which ones are or are not able to learn.

== Dimensional analogy ==
A net of a tesseract

To understand the nature of four-dimensional space, a device called dimensional analogy is commonly employed. Dimensional analogy is the study of how (n − 1) dimensions relate to n dimensions, and then inferring how n dimensions would relate to (n + 1) dimensions.

The dimensional analogy was used by Edwin Abbott Abbott in the book Flatland, which narrates a story about a square that lives in a two-dimensional world, like the surface of a piece of paper. From the perspective of this square, a three-dimensional being has seemingly god-like powers, such as ability to remove objects from a safe without breaking it open (by moving them across the third dimension), to see everything that from the two-dimensional perspective is enclosed behind walls, and to remain completely invisible by standing a few inches away in the third dimension.

By applying dimensional analogy, one can infer that a four-dimensional being would be capable of similar feats from the three-dimensional perspective. Rudy Rucker illustrates this in his novel Spaceland, in which the protagonist encounters four-dimensional beings who demonstrate such powers.

=== Cross-sections ===
As a three-dimensional object passes through a two-dimensional plane, two-dimensional beings in this plane would only observe a cross-section of the three-dimensional object within this plane. For example, if a sphere passed through a sheet of paper, beings in the paper would see first a single point. A circle gradually grows larger, until it reaches the diameter of the sphere, and then gets smaller again, until it shrinks to a point and disappears. The 2D beings would not see a circle in the same way as three-dimensional beings do; rather, they only see a one-dimensional projection of the circle on their 1D "retina". Similarly, if a four-dimensional object passed through a three-dimensional (hyper) surface, one could observe a three-dimensional cross-section of the four-dimensional object. For example, a hypersphere would appear first as a point, then as a growing sphere (until it reaches the "hyperdiameter" of the hypersphere), with the sphere then shrinking to a single point and then disappearing. This means of visualizing aspects of the fourth dimension was used in the novel Flatland and also in several works of Charles Howard Hinton. And, in the same way, three-dimensional beings (such as humans with a 2D retina) can see all the sides and the insides of a 2D shape simultaneously, a 4D being could see all faces and the inside of a 3D shape at once with their 3D retina.

=== Projections ===
A useful application of dimensional analogy in visualizing higher dimensions is in projection. A projection is a way of representing an n-dimensional object in n − 1 dimensions. For instance, computer screens are two-dimensional, and all the photographs of three-dimensional people, places, and things are represented in two dimensions by projecting the objects onto a flat surface. By doing this, the dimension orthogonal to the screen (depth) is removed and replaced with indirect information. The retina of the eye is also a two-dimensional array of receptors but the brain can perceive the nature of three-dimensional objects by inference from indirect information (such as shading, foreshortening, binocular vision, etc.). Artists often use perspective to give an illusion of three-dimensional depth to two-dimensional pictures. The shadow, cast by a fictitious grid model of a rotating tesseract on a plane surface, as shown in the figures, is also the result of projections.

Similarly, objects in the fourth dimension can be mathematically projected to the familiar three dimensions, where they can be more conveniently examined. In this case, the 'retina' of the four-dimensional eye is a three-dimensional array of receptors. A hypothetical being with such an eye would perceive the nature of four-dimensional objects by inferring four-dimensional depth from indirect information in the three-dimensional images in its retina.

The perspective projection of three-dimensional objects into the retina of the eye introduces artifacts such as foreshortening, which the brain interprets as depth in the third dimension. In the same way, perspective projection from four dimensions produces similar foreshortening effects. By applying dimensional analogy, one may infer four-dimensional "depth" from these effects.

As an illustration of this principle, the following sequence of images compares various views of the three-dimensional cube with analogous projections of the four-dimensional tesseract into three-dimensional space.

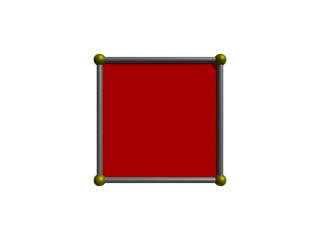
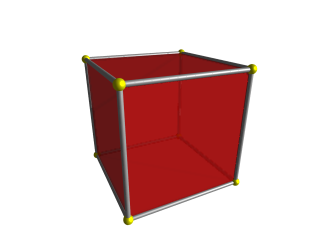
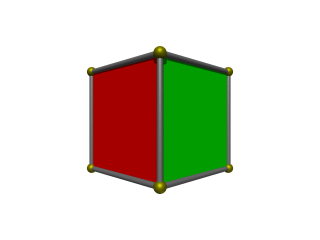
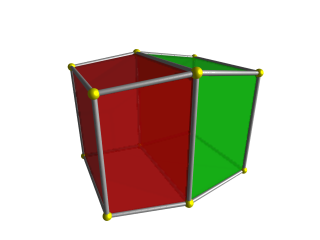
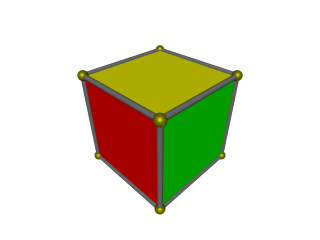
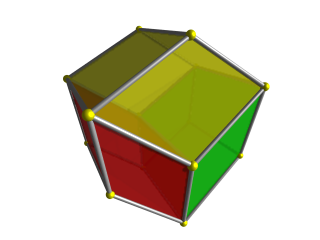
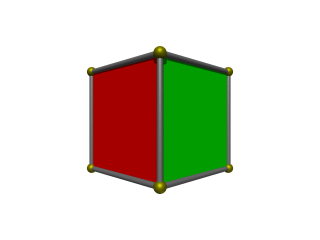
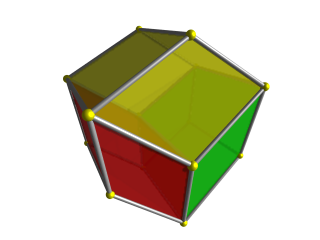
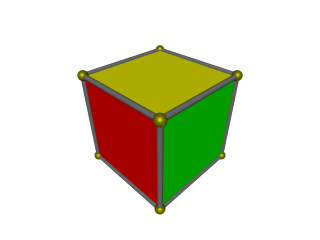
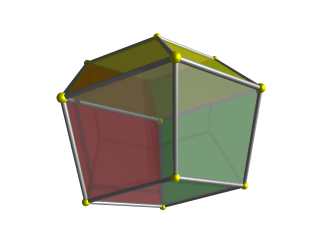
Cube	Tesseract	Description
		The image on the left is a cube viewed face-on. The analogous viewpoint of the tesseract in 4 dimensions is the cell-first perspective projection, shown on the right. One may draw an analogy between the two: just as the cube projects to a square, the tesseract projects to a cube. Note that the other 5 faces of the cube are not seen here. They are obscured by the visible face. Similarly, the other 7 cells of the tesseract are not seen here because they are obscured by the visible cell.
		The image on the left shows the same cube viewed edge-on. The analogous viewpoint of a tesseract is the face-first perspective projection, shown on the right. Just as the edge-first projection of the cube consists of two trapezoids, the face-first projection of the tesseract consists of two frustums. The nearest edge of the cube in this viewpoint is the one lying between the red and green faces. Likewise, the nearest face of the tesseract is the one lying between the red and green cells.
		On the left is the cube viewed corner-first. This is analogous to the edge-first perspective projection of the tesseract, shown on the right. Just as the cube's vertex-first projection consists of 3 deltoids surrounding a vertex, the tesseract's edge-first projection consists of 3 hexahedral volumes surrounding an edge. Just as the nearest vertex of the cube is the one where the three faces meet, the nearest edge of the tesseract is the one in the center of the projection volume, where the three cells meet.
		A different analogy may be drawn between the edge-first projection of the tesseract and the edge-first projection of the cube. The cube's edge-first projection has two trapezoids surrounding an edge, while the tesseract has three hexahedral volumes surrounding an edge.
		On the left is the cube viewed corner-first. The vertex-first perspective projection of the tesseract is shown on the right. The cube's vertex-first projection has three tetragons surrounding a vertex, but the tesseract's vertex-first projection has four hexahedral volumes surrounding a vertex. Just as the nearest corner of the cube is the one lying at the center of the image, so the nearest vertex of the tesseract lies not on the boundary of the projected volume, but at its center inside, where all four cells meet. Only three of the cube's six faces can be seen here, because the other three faces lie behind these three faces, on the opposite side of the cube. Similarly, only four of the tesseract's eight cells can be seen here; the remaining four lie behind these four in the fourth direction, on the far side of the tesseract.

=== Shadows ===
A concept closely related to projection is the casting of shadows.

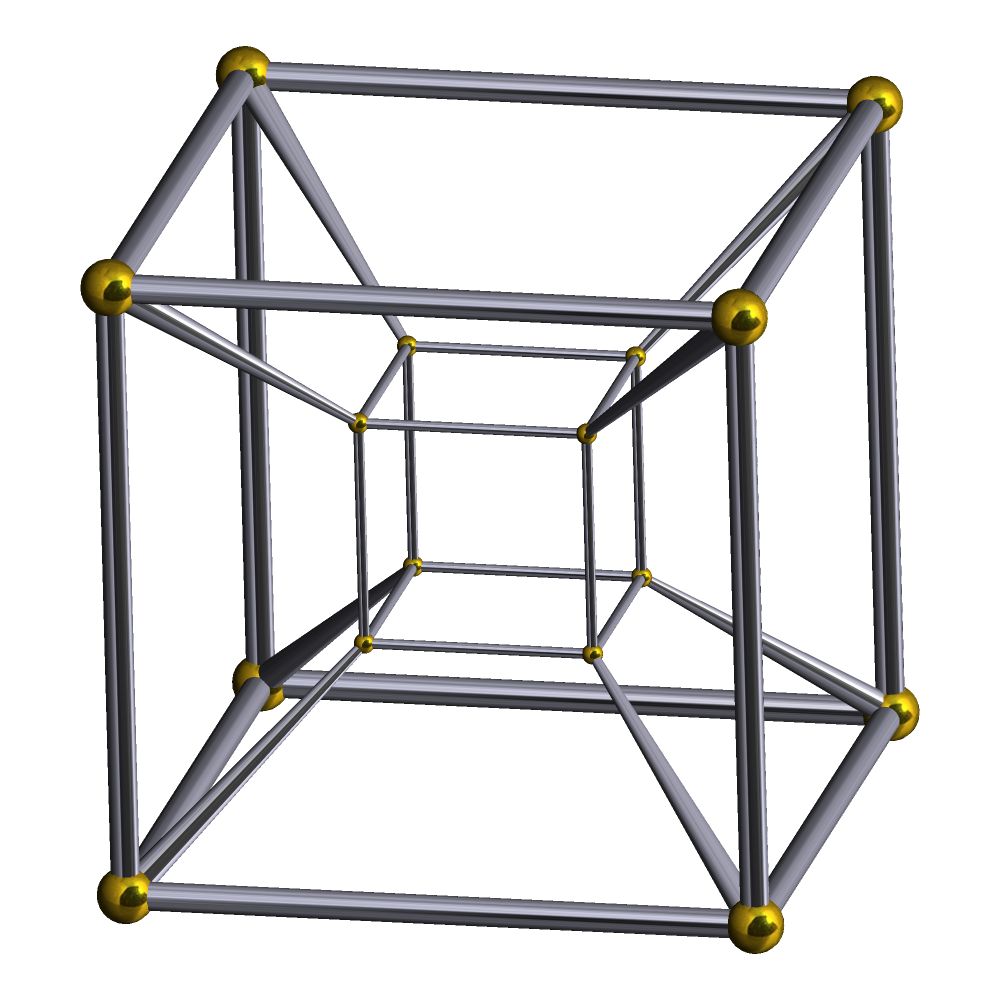

If a light is shone on a three-dimensional object, a two-dimensional shadow is cast. By dimensional analogy, light shone on a two-dimensional object in a two-dimensional world would cast a one-dimensional shadow, and light on a one-dimensional object in a one-dimensional world would cast a zero-dimensional shadow, that is, a point of non-light. Going the other way, one may infer that light shining on a four-dimensional object in a four-dimensional world would cast a three-dimensional shadow.

If the wireframe of a cube is lit from above, the resulting shadow on a flat two-dimensional surface is a square within a square with the corresponding corners connected. Similarly, if the wireframe of a tesseract were lit from "above" (in the fourth dimension), its shadow would be that of a three-dimensional cube within another three-dimensional cube suspended in midair (a "flat" surface from a four-dimensional perspective). (Note that, technically, the visual representation shown here is a two-dimensional image of the three-dimensional shadow of the four-dimensional wireframe figure.)

=== Bounding regions ===
The dimensional analogy also helps in inferring basic properties of objects in higher dimensions, such as the bounding region. For example, two-dimensional objects are bounded by one-dimensional boundaries: a square is bounded by four edges. Three-dimensional objects are bounded by two-dimensional surfaces: a cube is bounded by 6 square faces.

By applying dimensional analogy, one may infer that a four-dimensional cube, known as a tesseract, is bounded by three-dimensional volumes. And indeed, this is the case: mathematics shows that the tesseract is bounded by 8 cubes. Knowing this is key to understanding how to interpret a three-dimensional projection of the tesseract. The boundaries of the tesseract project to volumes in the image, not merely two-dimensional surfaces.

=== Hypervolume ===
The 4-volume or hypervolume in 4D can be calculated in closed form for simple geometrical figures, such as the tesseract (s^{4}, for side length s) and the 4-ball ($\pi^2 r^4 /2$ for radius r).

Reasoning by analogy from familiar lower dimensions can be an excellent intuitive guide, but care must be exercised not to accept results that are not more rigorously tested. For example, consider the formulas for the area enclosed by a circle in two dimensions ($A = \pi r^2$) and the volume enclosed by a sphere in three dimensions ($V = \frac{4}{3} \pi r^3$). One might guess that the volume enclosed by the sphere in four-dimensional space is a rational multiple of $\pi r^4$, but the correct volume is $\frac{\pi^2}{2} r^4$. The volume of an n-ball in an arbitrary dimension n is computable from a recurrence relation connecting dimension n to dimension n - 2.

== In culture ==
=== In art ===
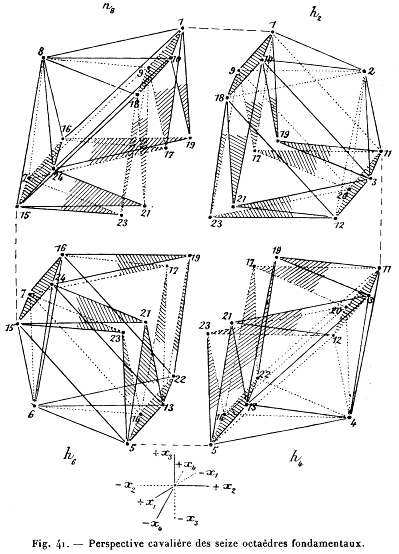
An illustration from Jouffret's Traité élémentaire de géométrie à quatre dimensions. The book, which influenced Picasso, was given to him by Princet.

New possibilities opened up by the concept of four-dimensional space (and difficulties involved in trying to visualize it) helped inspire many modern artists in the first half of the twentieth century. Early Cubists, Surrealists, Futurists, and abstract artists took ideas from higher-dimensional mathematics and used them to radically advance their work.

=== In literature ===
Science fiction texts often mention the concept of "dimension" when referring to parallel or alternate universes or other imagined planes of existence. This usage is derived from the idea that to travel to parallel/alternate universes/planes of existence one must travel in a direction/dimension besides the standard ones. In effect, the other universes/planes are just a small distance away from this universe, but the distance is in a fourth (or higher) spatial (or non-spatial) dimension, not the standard ones.

One of the most heralded science fiction stories regarding true geometric dimensionality, and often recommended as a starting point for those just starting to investigate such matters, is the 1884 novella Flatland by Edwin A. Abbott. Isaac Asimov, in his foreword to the Signet Classics 1984 edition, described Flatland as "The best introduction one can find into the manner of perceiving dimensions."

The idea of other dimensions was incorporated into many early science fiction stories, appearing prominently, for example, in Miles J. Breuer's The Appendix and the Spectacles (1928) and Murray Leinster's The Fifth-Dimension Catapult (1931); and appeared irregularly in science fiction by the 1940s. Classic stories involving other dimensions include Robert A. Heinlein's —And He Built a Crooked House (1941), in which a California architect designs a house based on a three-dimensional projection of a tesseract; Alan E. Nourse's Tiger by the Tail and The Universe Between (both 1951); and The Ifth of Oofth (1957) by Walter Tevis. Another reference is Madeleine L'Engle's novel A Wrinkle In Time (1962), which uses the fifth dimension as a way of "tesseracting the universe" or "folding" space to move across it quickly. The fourth and fifth dimensions are also key components of the book The Boy Who Reversed Himself (1986) by William Sleator.

=== In philosophy ===
Immanuel Kant wrote in 1783: "That everywhere space (which is not itself the boundary of another space) has three dimensions and that space, in general, cannot have more dimensions is based on the proposition that not more than three lines can intersect at right angles in one point. This proposition cannot at all be shown from concepts, but rests immediately on intuition and indeed on pure intuition a priori because it is apodictically (demonstrably) certain."

"Space has Four Dimensions" is a short story published in 1846 by German philosopher and experimental psychologist Gustav Fechner under the pseudonym "Dr. Mises". The protagonist in the tale is a shadow who is aware of and able to communicate with other shadows, but who is trapped on a two-dimensional surface. According to Fechner, this "shadow-man" would conceive of the third dimension as being one of time. The story bears a strong similarity to the "Allegory of the Cave" presented in Plato's The Republic (c. 380 BC).

Simon Newcomb wrote an article for the Bulletin of the American Mathematical Society in 1898 entitled "The Philosophy of Hyperspace". Linda Dalrymple Henderson coined the term "hyperspace philosophy", used to describe writing that uses higher dimensions to explore metaphysical themes, in her 1983 thesis about the fourth dimension in early-twentieth-century art. Examples of "hyperspace philosophers" include Charles Howard Hinton, the first writer, in 1888, to use the word "tesseract"; and the Russian esotericist P. D. Ouspensky.

== See also ==
- 4-manifold
- 4-polytope
- Exotic R^{4}
- Four-dimensionalism
- List of four-dimensional games
- Spacetime
- Time in physics
