= Vector algebra =

In mathematics, vector algebra may mean:

- The operations of vector addition and scalar multiplication of a vector space
- The algebraic operations in vector calculus (vector analysis) – including the dot and cross products of 3-dimensional Euclidean space
- Algebra over a field – a vector space equipped with a bilinear product
- Any of the original vector algebras of the nineteenth century, including
  - Quaternions
  - Tessarines
  - Coquaternions
  - Biquaternions
  - Hyperbolic quaternions
