= Hyperboloid model =

Model of n-dimensional hyperbolic geometry

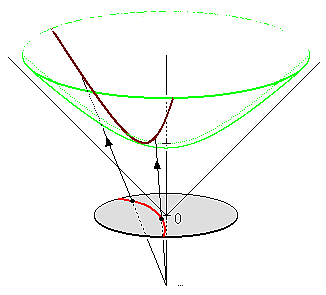
Red circular arc is geodesic in Poincaré disk model; it projects to the brown geodesic on the green hyperboloid.

Animation of partial {7,3} hyperbolic tiling of the hyperboloid rotated into the Poincaré perspective.

In geometry, the hyperboloid model, also known as the Minkowski model after Hermann Minkowski, is a model of n-dimensional hyperbolic geometry in which points are represented by points on the forward sheet S^{+} of a two-sheeted hyperboloid in (n+1)-dimensional Minkowski space or by the displacement vectors from the origin to those points, and m-planes are represented by the intersections of (m+1)-planes passing through the origin in Minkowski space with S^{+} or by wedge products of m vectors. Hyperbolic space is embedded isometrically in Minkowski space; that is, the hyperbolic distance function is inherited from Minkowski space, analogous to the way spherical distance is inherited from Euclidean distance when the n-sphere is embedded in (n+1)-dimensional Euclidean space.

Other models of hyperbolic space can be thought of as map projections of S^{+}: the Beltrami–Klein model is the projection of S^{+} through the origin onto a plane perpendicular to a vector from the origin to specific point in S^{+} analogous to the gnomonic projection of the sphere; the Poincaré disk model is a projection of S^{+} through a point on the other sheet S^{−} onto perpendicular plane, analogous to the stereographic projection of the sphere; the Gans model is the orthogonal projection of S^{+} onto a plane perpendicular to a specific point in S^{+}, analogous to the orthographic projection; the band model of the hyperbolic plane is a conformal “cylindrical” projection analogous to the Mercator projection of the sphere; Lobachevsky coordinates are a cylindrical projection analogous to the equirectangular projection (longitude, latitude) of the sphere.

== Minkowski quadratic form ==
If (x_{0}, x_{1}, ..., x_{n}) is a vector in the (n + 1)-dimensional coordinate space R^{n+1}, the Minkowski quadratic form is defined to be

$$Q(x_0, x_1, \ldots, x_n) = -x_0^2 + x_1^2 + \ldots + x_n^2.$$

The vectors v ∈ R^{n+1} such that Q(v) = −1 form an n-dimensional hyperboloid S consisting of two connected components, or sheets: the forward, or future, sheet S^{+}, where x_{0}>0 and the backward, or past, sheet S^{−}, where x_{0}<0. The points of the n-dimensional hyperboloid model are the points on the forward sheet S^{+}.

The metric on the hyperboloid is
$$ds^2 = Q(dx_0, dx_1, \ldots, dx_n) = -dx_0^2 + dx_1^2 + \ldots + dx_n^2.$$
The Minkowski bilinear form B is the polarization of the Minkowski quadratic form Q,

$$B(\mathbf{u}, \mathbf{v}) = (Q(\mathbf{u}+\mathbf{v}) - Q(\mathbf{u}) - Q(\mathbf{v})) / 2 .$$

(This is sometimes also written using scalar product notation $\mathbf{u}\cdot\mathbf{v}.$) Explicitly,

$$B((x_0, x_1, \ldots, x_n), (y_0, y_1, \ldots, y_n)) = -x_0y_0 + x_1 y_1 + \ldots + x_n y_n .$$

The hyperbolic distance between two points u and v of S^{+} is given by the formula

$$d(\mathbf{u}, \mathbf{v}) = \operatorname{arcosh}(-B(\mathbf{u}, \mathbf{v})) ,$$

where arcosh is the inverse function of hyperbolic cosine.

=== Choice of metric signature ===
The bilinear form $B$ also functions as the metric tensor over the space. In n+1 dimensional Minkowski space, there are two choices for the metric with opposite signature, in the 3-dimensional case either (+, −, −) or (−, +, +).

If the signature (−, +, +) is chosen, then the scalar square of chords between distinct points on the same sheet of the hyperboloid will be positive, which more closely aligns with conventional definitions and expectations in mathematics. Then n-dimensional hyperbolic space is a Riemannian space and distance or length can be defined as the square root of the scalar square. If the signature (+, −, −) is chosen, scalar square between distinct points on the hyperboloid will be negative, so various definitions of basic terms must be adjusted, which can be inconvenient. Nonetheless, the signature (+, −, −, −) is also common for describing spacetime in physics. (Cf. Sign convention#Metric signature.)

== Straight lines ==
A straight line in hyperbolic n-space is modeled by a geodesic on the hyperboloid. A geodesic on the hyperboloid is the (non-empty) intersection of the hyperboloid with a two-dimensional linear subspace (a plane through the origin) of the n+1-dimensional Minkowski space. If we take u and v to be basis vectors of that linear subspace with

$$B (\mathbf{u}, \mathbf{u}) = 1$$
$$B (\mathbf{v}, \mathbf{v}) = -1$$
$$B (\mathbf{u}, \mathbf{v}) = B (\mathbf{v}, \mathbf{u}) = 0$$

and use w as a real parameter for points on the geodesic, then

$$\mathbf{u} \sinh w + \mathbf{v} \cosh w$$

will be a point on the geodesic.

More generally, a k-dimensional "flat" in the hyperbolic n-space will be modeled by the (non-empty) intersection of the hyperboloid with a k+1-dimensional linear subspace (including the origin) of the Minkowski space.

== Isometries ==
The indefinite orthogonal group O(1,n), also called the (n+1)-dimensional Lorentz group, is the Lie group of real (n+1)×(n+1) matrices which preserve the Minkowski bilinear form. In a different language, it is the group of linear isometries of the Minkowski space. In particular, this group preserves the hyperboloid S. Recall that indefinite orthogonal groups have four connected components, corresponding to reversing or preserving the orientation on each subspace (here 1-dimensional and n-dimensional), and form a Klein four-group. The subgroup of O(1,n) that preserves the sign of the first coordinate is the orthochronous Lorentz group, denoted O^{+}(1,n), and has two components, corresponding to preserving or reversing the orientation of the spatial subspace. Its subgroup SO^{+}(1,n) consisting of matrices with determinant one is a connected Lie group of dimension n(n+1)/2 which acts on S^{+} by linear automorphisms and preserves the hyperbolic distance. This action is transitive and the stabilizer of the vector (1,0,...,0) consists of the matrices of the form

$$\begin{pmatrix}
1      & 0 & \ldots & 0 \\
0      &   &        &   \\[-4mu]
\vdots &   & A      &   \\
0      &   &        &   \\
\end{pmatrix}$$

where $A$ belongs to the compact special orthogonal group SO(n) (generalizing the rotation group SO(3) for n = 3). It follows that the n-dimensional hyperbolic space can be exhibited as the homogeneous space and a Riemannian symmetric space of rank 1,

$$\mathbb{H}^n=\mathrm{SO}^{+}(1,n)/\mathrm{SO}(n).$$

The group SO^{+}(1,n) is the full group of orientation-preserving isometries of the n-dimensional hyperbolic space.

In more concrete terms, SO^{+}(1,n) can be split into n(n−1)/2 rotations (formed with a regular Euclidean rotation matrix in the lower-right block) and n hyperbolic translations, which take the form

$$\begin{pmatrix}
\cosh \alpha & \sinh \alpha & 0 & \cdots \\[2mu]
\sinh \alpha & \cosh \alpha & 0 & \cdots \\[2mu]
0            & 0            & 1 &        \\[-7mu]
\vdots       & \vdots       &   & \ddots \\
\end{pmatrix}$$

where $\alpha$ is the distance translated (along the x-axis in this case), and the 2nd row/column can be exchanged with a different pair to change to a translation along a different axis. The general form of a translation in 3 dimensions along the vector $(w, x, y, z)$ is:

$$\begin{pmatrix}
w & x                  & y                  & z                  \\[2mu]
x & \ \dfrac{x^2}{w+1}+1 & \dfrac{yx}{w+1}    & \dfrac{zx}{w+1}    \\[2mu]
y & \dfrac{xy}{w+1}    & \,\dfrac{y^2}{w+1}+1 & \dfrac{zy}{w+1}    \\[2mu]
z & \dfrac{xz}{w+1}    & \dfrac{yz}{w+1}    & \dfrac{z^2}{w+1}+1
\end{pmatrix}_{\vphantom|},$$

where $\textstyle w = \sqrt{x^2+y^2+z^2+1}$. This extends naturally to more dimensions, and is also the simplified version of a Lorentz boost when you remove the relativity-specific terms.

=== Examples of groups of isometries ===
The group of all isometries of the hyperboloid model is O^{+}(1,n). Any group of isometries is a subgroup of it.

==== Reflections ====
For two points $\mathbf p, \mathbf q \in \mathbb{H}^n, \mathbf p \neq \mathbf q$, there is a unique reflection exchanging them.

Let $\mathbf u = \frac {\mathbf p - \mathbf q}{\sqrt{Q(\mathbf p - \mathbf q)}}$. Note that $Q(\mathbf u) = 1$, and therefore $u \notin \mathbb{H}^n$.

Then

$$\mathbf x \mapsto \mathbf x - 2 B(\mathbf x, \mathbf u) \mathbf u$$

is a reflection that exchanges $\mathbf p$ and $\mathbf q$. This is equivalent to the following matrix:

$$R = I - 2 \mathbf u \mathbf u^{\operatorname{T}} \begin{pmatrix}
-1 &  0 \\
0 & I \\
\end{pmatrix}$$

(note the use of block matrix notation).

Then $\{I, R\}$ is a group of isometries. All such subgroups are conjugate.

==== Rotations and reflections ====
$$S = \left \{ \begin{pmatrix}
1 & 0 \\
0 & A \\
\end{pmatrix} : A \in O(n) \right \}$$

is the group of rotations and reflections that preserve $(1, 0, \dots, 0)$. The function
$$A \mapsto \begin{pmatrix}
1 & 0 \\
0 & A \\
\end{pmatrix}$$
is an isomorphism from O(n) to this group. For any point $p$, if $X$ is an isometry that maps $(1, 0, \dots, 0)$ to $p$, then $XSX^{-1}$ is the group of rotations and reflections that preserve $p$.

==== Translations ====
For any real number $t$, there is a translation

$$L_t = \begin{pmatrix}
\cosh t & \sinh t & 0 \\
\sinh t & \cosh t & 0 \\
0       & 0       & I \\
\end{pmatrix} = e^\begin{pmatrix}
0 & t & 0 \\
t & 0 & 0 \\
0 & 0 & 0 \\
\end{pmatrix}$$

(The expression on the RHS is a matrix exponential.) This is a translation of distance $t$ in the positive x direction if $t \ge 0$ or of distance $-t$ in the negative x direction if $t \le 0$. Any translation of distance $t$ is conjugate to $L_t$ and $L_{-t}$. The set $\left \{L_t : t \in \mathbb R \right \}$ is the group of translations through the x-axis, and a group of isometries is conjugate to it if and only if it is a group of isometries through a line.

For example, let's say we want to find the group of translations through a line $\overline{\mathbf p \mathbf q}$. Let $X$ be an isometry that maps $(1, 0, \dots, 0)$ to $p$ and let $Y$ be an isometry that fixes $p$ and maps $X L_{d(\mathbf p, \mathbf q)} [1, 0, \dots, 0]^{\operatorname{T}}$ to $q$. An example of such a $Y$ is a reflection exchanging $X L_{d(\mathbf p, \mathbf q)} [1, 0, \dots, 0]^{\operatorname{T}}$ and $q$ (assuming they are different), because they are both the same distance from $p$. Then $YX$ is an isometry mapping $(1, 0, \dots, 0)$ to $p$ and a point on the positive x-axis to $q$. $(YX)L_t(YX)^{-1}$ is a translation through the line $\overline{\mathbf p \mathbf q}$ of distance $|t|$. If $t \ge 0$, it is in the $\overrightarrow{\mathbf p \mathbf q}$ direction. If $t \le 0$, it is in the $\overrightarrow{\mathbf q \mathbf p}$ direction. $\left \{(YX)L_t(YX)^{-1} : t \in \mathbb R \right \}$ is the group of translations through $\overline{\mathbf p \mathbf q}$.

==== Symmetries of horospheres ====
Let H be some horosphere such that points of the form $(w, x, 0, \dots, 0)$ are inside of it for arbitrarily large x. For any vector b in $\mathbb R^{n-1}$

$$\begin{pmatrix}
1 + \tfrac12 \|\mathbf b\|^2 & - \tfrac12 \|\mathbf b\|^2   & \mathbf b^{\operatorname{T}} \\
\tfrac12 \|\mathbf b\|^2     & 1 - \tfrac12 \|\mathbf b\|^2 & \mathbf b^{\operatorname{T}} \\
\mathbf b                    & -\mathbf b                   & I
\end{pmatrix} = e^\begin{pmatrix}
0 & 0 & \mathbf b^{\operatorname{T}} \\
0 & 0 & \mathbf b^{\operatorname{T}} \\
\mathbf b & -\mathbf b & 0
\end{pmatrix}$$

is a hororotation that maps H to itself. The set of such hororotations is the group of hororotations preserving H. All hororotations are conjugate to each other.

For any $A$ in O(n−1)

$$\begin{pmatrix}
1 & 0 & 0 \\
0 & 1 & 0 \\
0 & 0 & A \\
\end{pmatrix}$$

is a rotation or reflection that preserves H and the x-axis. These hororotations, rotations, and reflections generate the group of symmetries of H. The symmetry group of any horosphere is conjugate to it. They are isomorphic to the Euclidean group E(n−1).

== History ==
In several papers between 1878–1885, Wilhelm Killing used the representation he attributed to Karl Weierstrass for Lobachevskian geometry. In particular, he discussed quadratic forms such as $k^{2}t^{2}+u^{2}+v^{2}+w^{2}=k^{2}$ or in arbitrary dimensions $k^{2}x_{0}^{2}+x_{1}^{2}+\dots+x_{n}^{2}=k^{2}$, where $k$ is the reciprocal measure of curvature, $k^{2}=\infty$ denotes Euclidean geometry, $k^{2}>0$ elliptic geometry, and $k^{2}<0$ hyperbolic geometry.

According to Jeremy Gray (1986), Poincaré used the hyperboloid model in his personal notes in 1880. Poincaré published his results in 1881, in which he discussed the invariance of the quadratic form $\xi^{2}+\eta^{2}-\zeta^{2}=-1$. Gray shows where the hyperboloid model is implicit in later writing by Poincaré.

Also Homersham Cox in 1882 used Weierstrass coordinates (without using this name) satisfying the relation $z^{2}-x^{2}-y^{2}=1$ as well as $w^{2}-x^{2}-y^{2}-z^{2}=1$.

Further exposure of the model was given by Alfred Clebsch and Ferdinand Lindemann in 1891 discussing the relation $x_{1}^{2}+x_{2}^{2}-4k^{2}x_{3}^{2}=-4k^{2}$ and $x_{1}^{2}+x_{2}^{2}+x_{3}^{2}-4k^{2}x_{4}^{2}=-4k^{2}$.

Weierstrass coordinates were also used by Gérard (1892), Felix Hausdorff (1899), Frederick S. Woods (1903)], Heinrich Liebmann (1905).

The hyperboloid was explored as a metric space by Alexander Macfarlane in his Papers in Space Analysis (1894). He noted that points on the hyperboloid could be written as

$$\cosh A + \alpha  \sinh A,$$

where α is a basis vector orthogonal to the hyperboloid axis. For example, he obtained the hyperbolic law of cosines through use of his Algebra of Physics.

H. Jansen made the hyperboloid model the explicit focus of his 1909 paper "Representation of hyperbolic geometry on a two sheeted hyperboloid". In 1993 W.F. Reynolds recounted some of the early history of the model in his article in the American Mathematical Monthly.

Being a commonplace model by the twentieth century, it was identified with the Geschwindigkeitsvectoren (velocity vectors) by Hermann Minkowski in his 1907 Göttingen lecture 'The Relativity Principle'. Scott Walter, in his 1999 paper "The Non-Euclidean Style of Minkowskian Relativity" recalls Minkowski's awareness, but traces the lineage of the model to Hermann Helmholtz rather than Weierstrass and Killing.

In the early years of relativity the hyperboloid model was used by Vladimir Varićak to explain the physics of velocity. In his speech to the German mathematical union in 1912 he referred to Weierstrass coordinates.

== See also ==
- Poincaré disk model
- Hyperbolic quaternions

== Notes and references ==
- Alekseevskij, D.V.; Vinberg, E.B.; Solodovnikov, A.S. (1993), Geometry of Spaces of Constant Curvature, Encyclopaedia of Mathematical Sciences, Berlin, New York: Springer-Verlag, ISBN 978-3-540-52000-9
- Anderson, James (2005), Hyperbolic Geometry, Springer Undergraduate Mathematics Series (2nd ed.), Berlin, New York: Springer-Verlag, ISBN 978-1-85233-934-0
- Ratcliffe, John G. (1994), Foundations of hyperbolic manifolds, Berlin, New York: Springer-Verlag, ISBN 978-0-387-94348-0, Chapter 3
- Miles Reid & Balázs Szendröi (2005) Geometry and Topology, Figure 3.10, p 45, Cambridge University Press, ISBN 0-521-61325-6, MR 2194744.
- Ryan, Patrick J. (1986), Euclidean and non-Euclidean geometry: An analytical approach, Cambridge, London, New York, New Rochelle, Melbourne, Sydney: Cambridge University Press, ISBN 978-0-521-25654-4
- Parkkonen, Jouni. "HYPERBOLIC GEOMETRY" (PDF).
