= LeRoy E. Doggett Prize =

Award in astronomy

The LeRoy E. Doggett Prize is awarded biennially by the Historical Astronomy Division of the American Astronomical Society for individuals who have significantly influenced the field of the history of astronomy by a career-long effort. The prize is a memorial to LeRoy Doggett, who was an active and highly regarded member of the Division and was serving as Secretary-Treasurer at the time of his untimely death.

Year	Recipient
1998	Curtis Wilson
2000	Owen Gingerich
2002	Donald E. Osterbrock
2004	Michael Hoskin
2006	Steven J. Dick
2008	David H. DeVorkin
2010	Michael J. Crowe
2012	Woodruff T. Sullivan III
2014	F. Richard Stephenson
2016	Albert van Helden
2018	Sara J. Schechner
2020	Robert W. Smith
2022	William H. Donahue
2024	Wayne Orchiston

== See also ==
- List of astronomy awards
