= Sara J. Schechner =

American historian of science

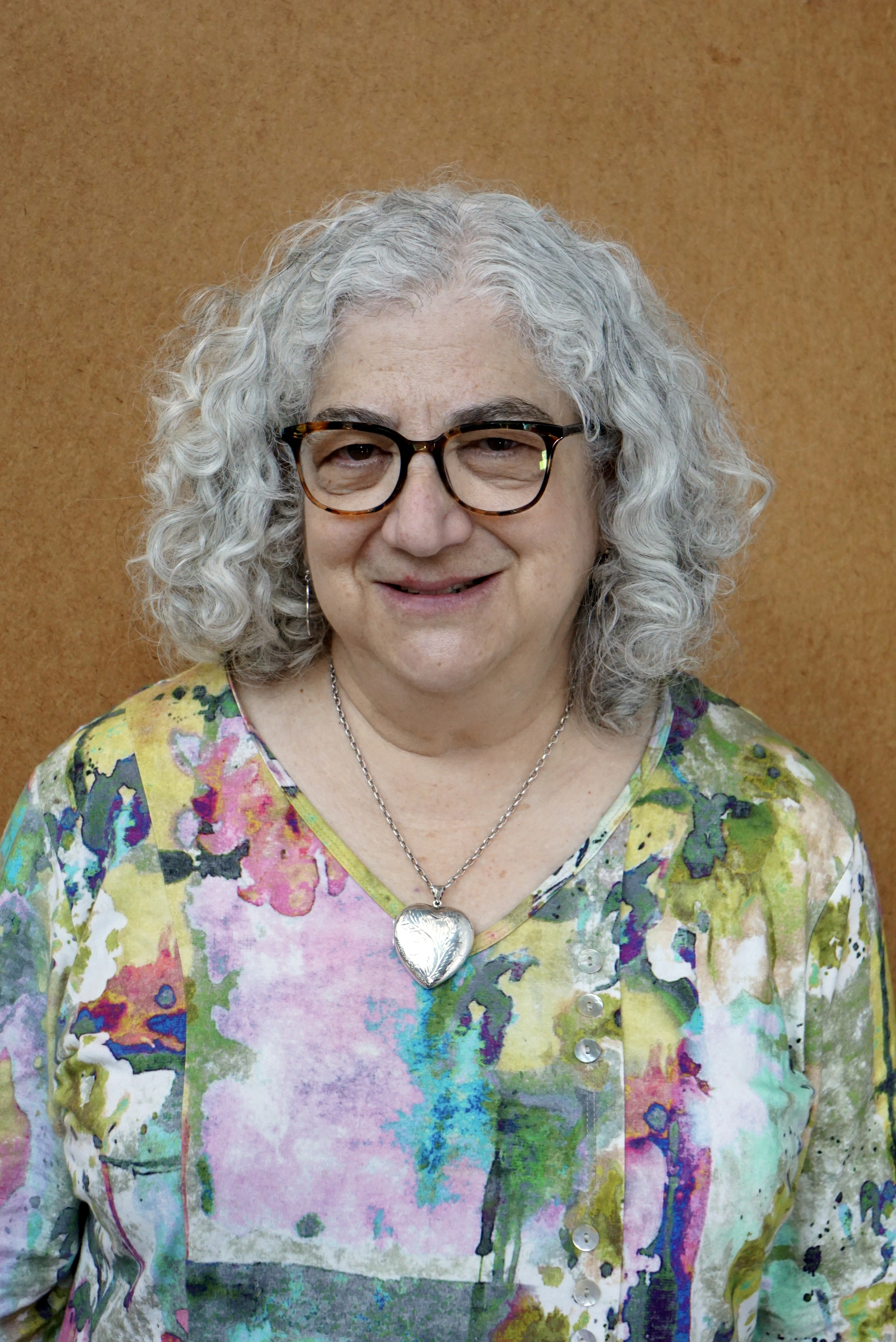
Schechner in 2025

Sara J. Schechner (born 1957) is an American historian of science, the David P. Wheatland Curator of the Collection of Historical Scientific Instruments and a lecturer on the History of Science at Harvard University.

== Life ==
Schechner earned her Bachelor of Arts in History and Science with Physics from Harvard-Radcliffe of Harvard University, graduating summa cum laude in 1979. During her time at Harvard, she was co-founder and player-coach of the ultimate frisbee team, and in 1976 the only woman on the team. Schechner then studied History and Philosophy of Science at the Emmanuel College of the Cambridge University and finished it with a Master of Philosophy in 1981. She completed her artium magister (Master of Arts) on the History of Science at the Harvard University in 1982. In 1988, she finalized her PhD on the History of Science at the Harvard University.

Afterwards, Schechner was chief curator at the Adler Planetarium in Chicago. She also curated exhibits for the Smithsonian Institution, the American Astronomical Society, and the American Physical Society. In 2000, she returned to Harvard University as the David P. Wheatland Curator of the Collection of Historical Scientific Instruments. She is also a lecturer on the History of Science at Harvard University.

== Selected publications ==
- Schechner, Sara (1997). Comets, popular culture, and the birth of modern cosmology. Princeton, N.J.: Princeton University Press. ISBN 0691011508. OCLC 36066082.
- Morrison-Low, A.D.; Schechner, Sara J.; Brenni, Paolo, eds. (2016). How scientific instruments have changed hands. Leiden; Boston: Brill. ISBN 9789004324923. LCCN 2016033199.
- Schechner, Sara (2019). Time of our lives : sundials of the Adler Planetarium. Chicago, Illinois: Adler Planetarium. ISBN 9780578497105.

== Awards ==
- 2020: Elected a Legacy Fellow of the American Astronomical Society in 2020.
- 2019: Paul Bunge Prize of the Society of German Chemists
- 2018: LeRoy E. Doggett Prize, American Astronomical Society
- 2018: Second Place, Telescopes-Mechanical/Other, Stellafane Convention, for a quilt, “This is Stellafane!” 2018.
- 2014: Great Exhibitions Prize for Body of Knowledge:A History of Anatomy (in 3 Parts), British Society for the History of Science
- 2014: Dean's Impact Award, Faculty of Arts and Sciences, Harvard University
- 2010: The Paul and Irene Hollister Lecturer on Glass, 2010.
- 2009: First Place, Telescopes-Mechanical/Special, Stellafane Convention, for a historical quilt,“The Great 26-Inch Telescope at Foggy Bottom,”
- 2008: Joseph H. Hazen Education Prize.
- 2007: First Place, International Design Awards 2007, for Time, Life, & Matter
- 2004: Helen Sawyer Hogg Public Lecturer, Royal Astronomical Society of Canada
- 1991–1992: Herbert C. Pollock Award
- From 1982: New York Academy of Sciences
- From 1979: Sigma Xi
- 1979: Sigma Xi Prize, Harvard
- 1979: Phi Beta Kappa, Harvard
