= A History of Vector Analysis =

Book on the history of mathematics by Michael J. Crowe

- Author: Michael J. Crowe
- Language: English
- Subject: Geometry
- Genre: Non-fiction
- Publisher: University of Notre Dame Press
- Publication date: 1967
- Publication place: United states
- Media type: Print

A History of Vector Analysis (1967) is a book on the history of vector analysis by Michael J. Crowe, originally published by the University of Notre Dame Press. As a scholarly treatment of a reformation in technical communication, the text is a contribution to the history of science. In 2002, Crowe gave a talk summarizing the book, including an entertaining introduction in which he covered its publication history and related the award of a Jean Scott prize of $4000. Crowe had entered the book in a competition for "a study on the history of complex and hypercomplex numbers" twenty-five years after his book was first published.

== Summary of book ==
The book has eight chapters: the first on the origins of vector analysis including Ancient Greek and 16th and 17th century influences; the second on the 19th century William Rowan Hamilton and quaternions; the third on other 19th and 18th century vectorial systems including equipollence of Giusto Bellavitis and the exterior algebra of Hermann Grassmann.

Chapter four is on the general interest in the 19th century on vectorial systems including analysis of journal publications as well as sections on major figures and their views (e.g., Peter Guthrie Tait as an advocate of Quaternions and James Clerk Maxwell as a critic of Quaternions); the fifth chapter describes the development of the modern system of vector analysis by Josiah Willard Gibbs and Oliver Heaviside.

In chapter six, "Struggle for existence", Michael J. Crowe delves into the zeitgeist that pruned down quaternion theory into vector analysis on three-dimensional space. He makes clear the ambition of this effort by considering five major texts as well as a couple dozen articles authored by participants in "The Great Vector Debate". These are the books:

Elementary Treatise on Quaternions (1890) Peter Guthrie Tait
Elements of Vector Analysis (1881,1884) Josiah Willard Gibbs
Electromagnetic Theory (1893,1899,1912) Oliver Heaviside
Utility of Quaternions in Physics (1893) Alexander McAulay
Vector Analysis and Quaternions (1906) Alexander Macfarlane

Twenty of the ancillary articles appeared in Nature; others were in Philosophical Magazine, London or Edinburgh Proceedings of the Royal Society, Physical Review, and Proceedings of the American Association for the Advancement of Science. The authors included Cargill Gilston Knott and a half-dozen other hands.

The "struggle for existence" is a phrase from Charles Darwin’s Origin of Species and Crowe quotes Darwin: "...young and rising naturalists,...will be able to view both sides of the question with impartiality." After 1901 with the Gibbs/Wilson/Yale publication Vector Analysis, the question was decided in favour of the vectorialists with separate dot and cross products. The pragmatic temper of the times set aside the four-dimensional source of vector algebra.

Crowe's chapter seven is a survey of "Twelve major publications in Vector Analysis from 1894 to 1910". Of these twelve, seven are in German, two in Italian, one in Russian, and two in English. Whereas the previous chapter examined a debate in English, the final chapter notes the influence of Heinrich Hertz' results with radio and the rush of German research using vectors. Joseph George Coffin of MIT and Clark University published his Vector Analysis in 1909; it too leaned heavily into applications. Thus Crowe provides a context for Gibbs and Wilson’s famous textbook of 1901.

The eighth chapter is the author's summary and conclusions. The book relies on references in chapter endnotes instead of a bibliography section. Crowe also states that the Bibliography of the Quaternion Association, and its supplements to 1912, already listed all the primary literature for the study.

== Summary of reviews ==
There were significant reviews given near the time of original publication. Stanley Goldberg wrote "The polemics on both sides make very rich reading, especially when they are spiced with the sarcastic wit of a Heaviside, and the fervent, almost religious railing of a Tait." Morris Kline begins his 1969 review with "Since historical publications on modern developments are rare, this book is welcome." and ends with "the subtitle [,The Evolution of the Idea of a Vectorial System,] is a better description of the contents than the title proper." Then William C. Waterhouse—picking up where Kline's review left off—writes in 1972 "Crowe's book on vector analysis seems a little anemic in comparison, perhaps because its title is misleading. ... [Crowe] does succeed in his goal of tracing the genealogy of the 3-space system, concluding that it was developed out of quaternions by physicists."

Karin Reich wrote that Arnold Sommerfeld's name was missing from the book. As assistant to Felix Klein, Sommerfeld was assigned the project of unifying vector concepts and notations for Klein's encyclopedia.

In 2003 Sandro Caparrini challenged Crowe’s conclusions by noting that "geometrical representations of forces and velocities by means of directed line segments...was already fairly well known by the middle of the eighteenth century" in his essay "Early Theories of Vectors". Caparrini cites several sources, in particular Gaetano Giorgini (1795 — 1874) and his appreciation in an 1830 article by Michel Chasles. Caparrini goes on to indicate that moments of forces and angular velocities were recognized as vectorial entities in the second half of the eighteenth century.

== See also ==
- History of quaternions
- Hypercomplex number
- Vector space
