= Robert W. Smith (historian) =

Robert W. Smith is a scholar of history and the classics at the University of Alberta, and he directed the Science, Technology and Society Program in the Faculty of Arts. He researches the history of big science, especially U.S. technology and the history of spaceflight. He wrote The Space Telescope: A Study of NASA, Science, Technology and Politics and he co-edited Reconsidering Sputnik: Forty Years After the Soviet Satellite. He served as the Walter Hines Page Fellow at the National Humanities Center in North Carolina in 1993–94. He held the Charles A. Lindbergh Chair in Aerospace History at the U.S. National Air and Space Museum, Smithsonian Institution during the academic year 2006–07. He is interested in the technology and politics of the James Webb Space Telescope. In 2020 he was awarded the LeRoy E. Doggett Prize for his histories of the Hubble Space Telescope and the planned James Webb Space Telescope.
