= Woodruff T. Sullivan III =

American astronomer

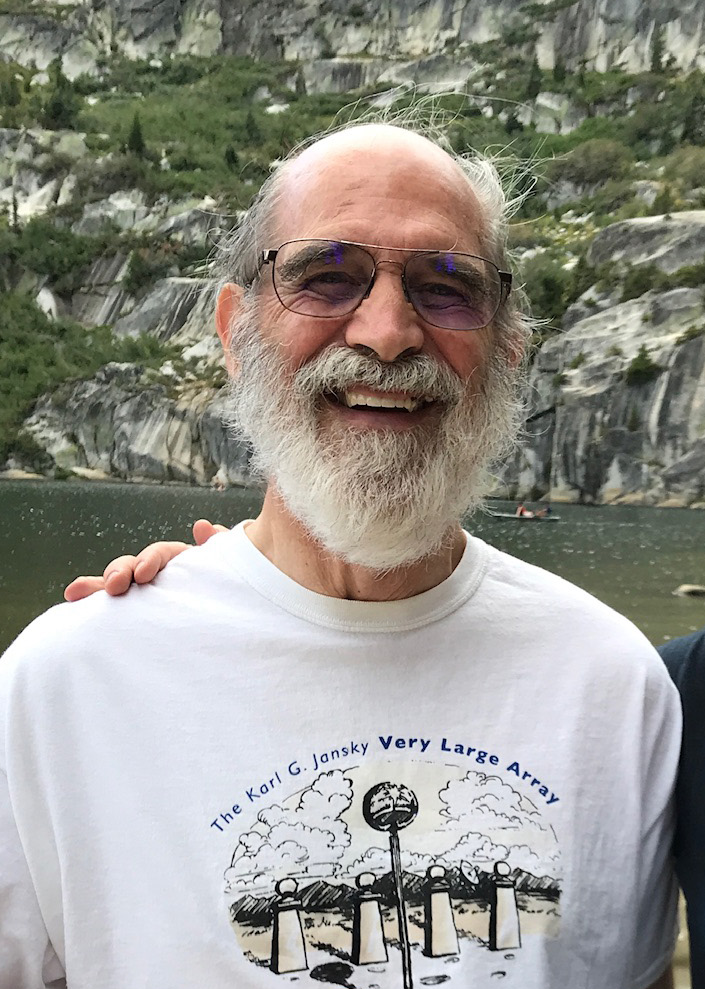
Woody Sullivan in 2022

Woodruff T. Sullivan III ("Woody" Sullivan) (born 1944) is an American physicist and astronomer, known primarily for his work in astrobiology, galactic astronomy and extragalactic astronomy, history of astronomy, gnomonics, and the search for extraterrestrial intelligence (SETI).

Sullivan was born in Colorado, USA. He went on to study physics at the Massachusetts Institute of Technology, where he received a B.S. in 1966, and in 1971 a Ph.D. (astronomy) from the University of Maryland (supervisor: Frank John Kerr).

In 2012, Sullivan received the LeRoy E. Doggett Prize from the American Astronomical Society's Historical Astronomy Division for his career contributions to the field of the history of astronomy, in particular his work on the history of early radio astronomy, culminating in his book Cosmic Noise: A History of Early Radio Astronomy (2009).

He was elected a Legacy Fellow of the American Astronomical Society in 2020.

== Earth radio leakage research ==
In order to sample the radio signature of Earth from an external site and thus test whether TV broadcasting is in fact the principal component, Sullivan and S. H. Knowles used the Moon as a passive reflector of Earth's radio frequency leakage. Using the 305-m Arecibo radio telescope, a wide range of frequencies were scanned between 100 and 400 MHz. After local interference was eliminated (using an on-Moon, off-Moon technique), the frequencies of most observed signals could be identified with the television AM video carriers of various nationalities. This experiment demonstrated that the lunar surface is capable of reflecting terrestrial band III (175–230 MHz) television signals
