= Arthur Stafford Hathaway =

American mathematician (1855 to 1934)

Arthur Stafford Hathaway (1855 — 1934) was an American mathematician.

Arthur was born September 15, 1855, in Keeler, Michigan.

A student at Cornell University, Hathaway earned a bachelor's degree in 1879. For two years he was instructor in mathematics at Friends High School in Baltimore. Hathaway studied with James Joseph Sylvester at Johns Hopkins University. From Sylvester's lectures he learned some number theory and published notes on congruences.

He was an instructor at Cornell University from 1885 to 1890 and an assistant professor in 1891.

In October 1884 William Thomson, Baron Kelvin led a master class on "Molecular Dynamics and the Wave Theory of Light" at Johns Hopkins. Kelvin did not provide a text for his course and Hathaway made notes in short-hand. He wrote up the notes and duplicated them with a Papyrograph, a recent stencil-based device. As the demand outstripped the supply, Hathaway corresponded with Kelvin back in Glasgow to prepare for proper publication. After nineteen years the lectures were published. In 1987 Hathaway's original transcription from 1884 was published when Johns Hopkins Center for the History and Philosophy of Science decided to commemorate the centennial of Kelvin's lectures.

In Terre Haute, Indiana Hathaway taught at Rose Polytechnic Institute until 1920 and published A Primer on Quaternions in 1896. He became the U.S. national secretary for the international Quaternion Association in 1899.

== Works ==
- 1883: Some Papers in the Theory of Numbers, American Journal of Mathematics 6: 316–30.
- 1887: A Memoir in the Theory of Numbers, American Journal of Mathematics 9(2): 162–79.
- 1896: A Primer on Quaternions from Project Gutenberg
- 1897: Review: Non-Euclidean Geometry, or the Science of Absolute Space, by Bolyai, translated by Halsted, in Science, February 19, link from Jstor Early Content.
- 1901: A Primer on Calculus, Macmillan Publishers, link from Archive.org.
- 1901: "Pure mathematics for engineering students", Bulletin of the American Mathematical Society 7(6):266–71.
- 1902: Quaternion Space, Transactions of the American Mathematical Society 3(1):46–59.
- 1906: Analytic Dynamics from University of Michigan Historical Math Collection.
- 1920: Dog swims after duck problem, American Mathematical Monthly 27(1):31.
