= Alexander Macfarlane =

Scottish physicist and mathematician (1851–1913)

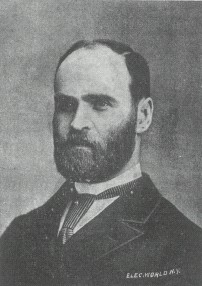
- Born: 21 April 1851; Blairgowrie, Scotland
- Died: 28 August 1913 (aged 62); Chatham, Ontario, Canada
- Education: University of Edinburgh
- Known for: Scientific biographies Algebra of Physics
- Spouse: Helen Swearingen
- Scientific career
- Fields: Logic; Physics; Mathematics
- Workplaces: University of Texas; Lehigh University
- Doctoral advisor: Peter Guthrie Tait

Alexander Macfarlane FRSE LLD (21 April 1851 – 28 August 1913) was a Scottish logician, physicist, and mathematician.

== Life ==
Macfarlane was born in Blairgowrie, Scotland, to Daniel MacFarlane (Shoemaker, Blairgowrie) and Ann Small. He studied at the University of Edinburgh. His doctoral thesis "The disruptive discharge of electricity" reported on experimental results from the laboratory of Peter Guthrie Tait.

In 1878 Macfarlane spoke at the Royal Society of Edinburgh on algebraic logic as introduced by George Boole. He was elected a Fellow of the Royal Society of Edinburgh. His proposers were Peter Guthrie Tait, Philip Kelland, Alexander Crum Brown, and John Hutton Balfour. The next year he published Principles of the Algebra of Logic which interpreted Boolean variable expressions with algebraic manipulation.

During his life, Macfarlane played a prominent role in research and education. He taught at the universities of Edinburgh and St Andrews, was physics professor at the University of Texas (1885–1894), professor of Advanced Electricity, and later of mathematical physics, at Lehigh University. In 1896 Macfarlane encouraged the association of quaternion students to promote the algebra. He became the Secretary of the Quaternion Association, and in 1909 its president. He edited the Bibliography of Quaternions that the Association published in 1904.

Macfarlane was also the author of a popular 1916 collection of mathematical biographies (Ten British Mathematicians), a similar work on physicists (Lectures on Ten British Physicists of the Nineteenth Century, 1919). Macfarlane was caught up in the revolution in geometry during his lifetime, in particular through the influence of G. B. Halsted who was mathematics professor at the University of Texas. Macfarlane originated an Algebra of Physics, which was his adaptation of quaternions to physical science. His first publication on Space Analysis preceded the presentation of Minkowski Space by seventeen years.

Macfarlane actively participated in several International Congresses of Mathematicians including the primordial meeting in Chicago, 1893, and the Paris meeting of 1900 where he spoke on "Application of space analysis to curvilinear coordinates".

Macfarlane retired to Chatham, Ontario, where he died in 1913.

== Space analysis ==
Alexander Macfarlane stylized his work as "Space Analysis". In 1894 he published his five earlier papers and a book review of Alexander McAulay's Utility of Quaternions in Physics. Page numbers are carried from previous publications, and the reader is presumed familiar with quaternions. The first paper is "Principles of the Algebra of Physics" where he first proposes the hyperbolic quaternion algebra, since "a student of physics finds a difficulty in principle of quaternions which makes the square of a vector negative." The second paper is "The Imaginary of the Algebra". Similar to Homersham Cox (1882/83), Macfarlane uses the hyperbolic versor as the hyperbolic quaternion corresponding to the versor of Hamilton. The presentation is encumbered by the notation

$$h \alpha ^ A = \cosh A + \sinh A \ \alpha ^{\pi/2}.$$

Later he conformed to the notation exp(A α) used by Euler and Sophus Lie. The expression $\alpha ^{\pi/2}$ is meant to emphasize that α is a right versor, where π/2 is the measure of a right angle in radians. The π/2 in the exponent is, in fact, superfluous.

Paper three is "Fundamental Theorems of Analysis Generalized for Space". At the 1893 mathematical congress Macfarlane read his paper "On the definition of the trigonometric functions" where he proposed that the radian be defined as a ratio of areas rather than of lengths: "the true analytical argument for the circular ratios is not the ratio of the arc to the radius, but the ratio of twice the area of a sector to the square on the radius." The paper was withdrawn from the published proceedings of mathematical congress (acknowledged at page 167), and privately published in his Papers on Space Analysis (1894). Macfarlane reached this idea or ratios of areas while considering the basis for hyperbolic angle which is analogously defined.

The fifth paper is "Elliptic and Hyperbolic Analysis" which considers the spherical law of cosines as the fundamental theorem of the sphere, and proceeds to analogues for the ellipsoid of revolution, general ellipsoid, and equilateral hyperboloids of one and two sheets, where he provides the hyperbolic law of cosines.

In 1900 Alexander published "Hyperbolic Quaternions" with the Royal Society in Edinburgh, and included a sheet of nine figures, two of which display conjugate hyperbolas. Having been stung in the Great Vector Debate over the non-associativity of his Algebra of Physics, he restored associativity by reverting to biquaternions, an algebra used by students of Hamilton since 1853.

== Works ==
- 1879: Principles of the Algebra of Logic from Internet Archive.
- 1885: Physical Arithmetic from Internet Archive.
- 1887: The Logical Form of Geometrical Theorems from Annals of Mathematics 3: 154,5.
- 1894: Papers on Space Analysis.
- 1898: Book Review: “La Mathematique; philosophie et enseignement” by C.A. Laissant in Science 8: 51–3.
- 1899 The Pythagorean Theorem from Science 34: 181,2.
- 1899: The Fundamental Principles of Algebra from Science 10: 345–364.
- 1906: Vector Analysis and Quaternions.
- 1910: Unification and Development of the Principles of the Algebra of Space from Bulletin of the Quaternion Association.
- 1911: Book Review: Life and Scientific Work of P.G. Tait by C.G. Knott from Science 34: 565,6.
- 1912: A System of Notation for Vector-Analysis; with a Discussion of the Underlying Principles from Bulletin of the Quaternion Association.
- 1913: On Vector-Analysis as Generalized Algebra, address to 5th International Congress of Mathematicians, Cambridge, via Internet Archive
- Macfarlane, Alexander (1916). Lectures on Ten British Mathematicians of the Nineteenth Century. Mathematical monographs, no. 17. New York: John Wiley and Sons. Archived from the original on 17 June 2017.
- Macfarlane, Alexander (1919). Lectures on Ten British Physicists of the Nineteenth Century. New York: John Wiley and Sons.
- Publications of Alexander Macfarlane from Bulletin of the Quaternion Association, 1913
