= Victor Schlegel =

German mathematician (1843 to 1905)

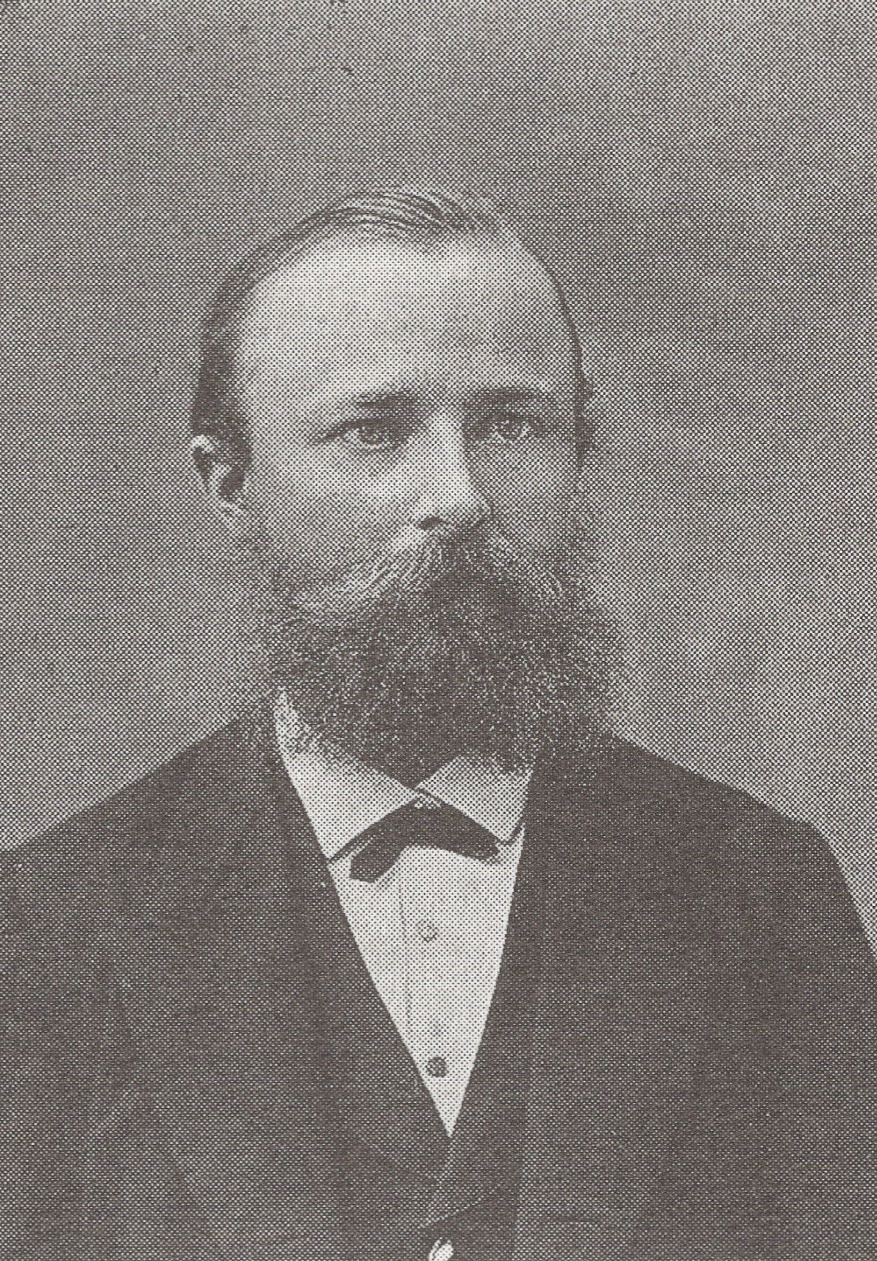
Victor Schlegel

Victor Schlegel (4 March 1843 – 22 November 1905) was a German mathematician. He is remembered for promoting the geometric algebra of Hermann Grassmann and for a method of visualizing polytopes called Schlegel diagrams.

In the nineteenth century there were various expansions of the traditional field of geometry through the innovations of hyperbolic geometry, non-Euclidean geometry and algebraic geometry. Hermann Grassmann was one of the more advanced innovators with his anticipation of linear algebra and multilinear algebra that he called "Extension theory" (Ausdehnungslehre). As recounted by David E. Rowe in 2010:

The most important new convert was Victor Schlegel, Grassmann’s colleague at Stettin Gymnasium from 1866 to 1868. Afterward Schlegel accepted a position as Oberlehrer at the Gymnasium in Waren, a small town in Mecklenburg.

In 1872 Schlegel published the first part of his System der Raumlehre which used Grassmann’s methods to develop plane geometry. Schlegel used his book to put forth Grassmann’s case, arguing that "Grassmann’s ideas had been neglected because he had not held a university chair." Continuing his criticism of academics, Schlegel expressed the reactionary view that

Rather than developing a sound basis for their analytic methods, contemporary mathematicians tended to invent new symbolisms on an ad hoc basis, creating a Babel-like cacophony of unintelligible languages.

Schlegel’s attitude was that no basis for scientific method was shown in mathematics, and "neglect of foundations had led to the widely acknowledged lack of interest in mathematics in the schools."

The mathematician Felix Klein addressed Schlegel’s book in a review criticizing him for neglect of cross ratio and failure to contextualize Grassmann in the flow of mathematical developments. Rowe indicates that Klein was most interested in developing his Erlangen program. In 1875 Schlegel countered with the second part of his System der Raumlehre, answering Klein in the preface. This part developed conic sections, harmonic ranges, projective geometry, and determinants.

Schlegel published a biography of Hermann Grassmann in 1878. Both parts of his textbook, and the biography, are now available at the Internet Archive; see External links section below.

At the Summer meeting of the American Mathematical Society on August 15, 1894, Schlegel presented an essay on the problem of finding the place which is at a minimum total distance from given points.

In 1899 Schlegel became German national secretary for the international Quaternion Association and reported on it in Monatshefte für Mathematik.
