= Alexander McAulay =

Australian mathematician (1863 to 1931)

- Born: 9 November 1863
- Died: 5 July 1931 (aged 67); Hobart, Tasmania, Australia
- Education: University of Cambridge; University of Manchester
- Known for: Work on quaternions
- Scientific career
- Fields: Mathematics and physics
- Workplaces: University of Tasmania; University of Melbourne
- Doctoral advisor: Ernest Rutherford
- Doctoral students: Neville Ronsley Parsons

Notes
- He is the brother of Francis Macaulay.

Alexander McAulay (9 November 1863 – 5 July 1931) was a mathematician and physicist who was the first professor of mathematics and physics at the University of Tasmania, Hobart, Australia. He was also a proponent of dual quaternions, which he termed "octonions" or "Clifford biquaternions".

== Life ==
McAulay was born on 9 November 1863 and attended Kingswood School in Bath. He proceeded to Caius College, Cambridge, there taking up a study of the quaternion algebra. In 1883 he published an article "Some general theorems in quaternion integration". McAulay took his degree in 1886, and began to reflect on the instruction of students in quaternion theory. In an article "Establishment of the fundamental properties of quaternions", he suggested improvements to the texts then in use. He also wrote a technical article on integration.

Departing for Australia, he became a lecturer and tutor in mathematics at Ormond College, University of Melbourne, from 1888 to 1895, being appointed first lecturer of mathematics in 1893. As a distant correspondent, he participated in a vigorous debate about the place of quaternions in physics education. In 1893 his book Utility of Quaternions in Physics was published. A. S. Hathaway contributed a positive review and Peter Guthrie Tait praised it in these terms:

Here, at last, we exclaim, is a man who has caught the full spirit of the quaternion system: the real aestus, the awen of the Welsh Bards, the divinus afflatus that transports the poet beyond the limits of sublunary things! Intuitively recognizing its power, he snatches up the magnificent weapon which Hamilton tenders us all, and at once dashes off to the jungle on the quest of big game.

In 1896, McAulay took up the position of first professor of mathematics and physics at the newly-founded University of Tasmania. He ceased teaching in 1924 due to incipient blindness and was selected as research professor until his retirement in 1929.

Following William Kingdon Clifford, who had extended quaternions to dual quaternions, McAulay made a special study of this hypercomplex number system. In 1898 McAulay published, through Cambridge University Press, his Octonions: a Development of Clifford's Biquaternions.

McAulay died from cerebral haemorrhage on 5 July 1931, in his home at Sandy Bay, Tasmania, and was buried in Hobart.

His brother Francis Sowerby Macaulay, who stayed in England, also contributed to ring theory. The University of Tasmania has commemorated the McAulays' contributions in Winter Public Lectures.

== Works ==
- 1893: Utility of Quaternions in Physics, link from Project Gutenberg.
- 1898: Octonions: a development of Clifford's Biquaternions, link from Internet Archive
- 1900: "Notes on the Electromagnetic Theory of Light", Philosophical Magazine 49(5):228–242.
