= Michael J. Crowe =

Professor and author (born 1936)

- Born: 1936 (age 89–90)
- Occupation: Historian of science
- Title: Rev. John J. Cavanaugh Professor Emeritus
- Awards: LeRoy E. Doggett Prize (2010)

Academic background
- Education: University of Notre Dame (BA, BS); University of Wisconsin (PhD)
- Thesis: The History of the Idea of a Vectorial System to 1910 (1965)

Academic work
- Discipline: History of science
- Sub-discipline: History of physics, astronomy
- Institutions: University of Notre Dame
- Notable works: A History of Vector Analysis (1967)

Michael J. Crowe (born 1936) is Rev. John J. Cavanaugh Professor Emeritus in the Program of Liberal Studies and Graduate Program in History and Philosophy of Science at the University of Notre Dame. He is best known for writing the influential book A History of Vector Analysis. After the Great Vector Debate of the 1890s it was generally assumed that quaternions had been superseded by vector analysis. But in his book, published in 1967, Crowe showed how, contrarily, vector analysis directly stemmed from the quaternions. In 1994 a new edition was published.

== Education and career ==
Crowe earned a BA in the Program of Liberal Studies and a BS in Science from the University of Notre Dame in 1958. He earned a PhD in the History of Science (with minors in Physics and Intellectual History) from the University of Wisconsin in 1965. His doctoral dissertation was The History of the Idea of a Vectorial System to 1910, which was published as the book A History of Vector Analysis two years later.

Thereafter Crowe wrote on various topics, from the history of physics and astronomy, to the Gestalt shifts in the Sherlock Holmes stories by Sir Arthur Conan Doyle. Crowe's book about the history of the extraterrestrial life debate was highly praised, and was followed by a companion source book in 2008.

== Honors ==
In 2010 Crowe was awarded the LeRoy E. Doggett Prize for Historical Astronomy by the American Astronomical Society.

== Bibliography ==
- 1994 A History of Vector Analysis : The Evolution of the Idea of a Vectorial System by Michael J. Crowe, Dover Publications, Inc. New York. 1st ed. 1967, Univ. of Notre Dame Press, Notre Dame.
- 1994 Modern theories of the universe: from Herschel to Hubble by Michael J. Crowe, New York: Dover Publications.
- 1999 The Extraterrestrial Life Debate, 1750-1900 by Michael J. Crowe, Dover Publications, 1st ed. 1986, Cambridge University Press.
- 2008 The Extraterrestrial Life Debate: Antiquity to 1915 by Michael J. Crowe, University of Notre Dame Press.
- 2018 The Gestalt Shift in Conan Doyle's Sherlock Holmes stories, by Michael J. Crowe, Cham, Palgrave MacMillan.
