= Witting polytope =

Witting polytope
Schläfli symbol	_{3}{3}_{3}{3}_{3}{3}_{3} 3(24)3(24)3(24)3
Coxeter diagram	
Cells	240 _{3}{3}_{3}{3}_{3}
Faces	2160 _{3}{3}_{3}
Edges	2160 _{3}{}
Vertices	240
Petrie polygon	30-gon
van Oss polygon	90 _{3}{4}_{3}
Shephard group	L_{4} = _{3}[3]_{3}[3]_{3}[3]_{3}, order 155,520
Dual polyhedron	Self-dual
Properties	Regular

In 4-dimensional complex geometry, the Witting polytope is a regular complex polytope, named as: _{3}{3}_{3}{3}_{3}{3}_{3}, and Coxeter diagram. It has 240 vertices, 2160 _{3}{} edges, 2160 _{3}{3}_{3} faces, and 240 _{3}{3}_{3}{3}_{3} cells. It is self-dual. Each vertex belongs to 27 edges, 72 faces, and 27 cells, corresponding to the Hessian polyhedron vertex figure.

== Symmetry ==
Its symmetry by _{3}[3]_{3}[3]_{3}[3]_{3} or, order 155,520. It has 240 copies of, order 648 at each cell.

== Structure ==
The configuration matrix is: $\left [\begin{smallmatrix}240&27&72&27\\3&2160&8&8\\8&8&2160&3\\27&72&27&240\end{smallmatrix}\right ]$

The number of vertices, edges, faces, and cells are seen in the diagonal of the matrix. These are computed by the order of the group divided by the order of the subgroup, by removing certain complex reflections, shown with X below. The number of elements of the k-faces are seen in rows below the diagonal. The number of elements in the vertex figure, etc., are given in rows above the digonal.

L_{4}	k-face	f_{k}	f_{0}	f_{1}	f_{2}	f_{3}	k-figure	Notes
L_{3}	( )	f_{0}	240	27	72	27	_{3}{3}_{3}{3}_{3}	L_{4}/L_{3} = 216*6!/27/4! = 240
L_{2}L_{1}	_{3}{ }	f_{1}	3	2160	8	8	_{3}{3}_{3}	L_{4}/L_{2}L_{1} = 216*6!/4!/3 = 2160
L_{2}L_{1}	_{3}{3}_{3}	f_{2}	8	8	2160	3	_{3}{ }	L_{4}/L_{2}L_{1} = 216*6!/4!/3 = 2160
L_{3}	_{3}{3}_{3}{3}_{3}	f_{3}	27	72	27	240	( )	L_{4}/L_{3} = 216*6!/27/4! = 240

== Coordinates ==
Its 240 vertices are given coordinates in $\mathbb{C}^4$:

(0, ±ω^{μ}, -±ω^{ν}, ±ω^{λ}) (-±ω^{μ}, 0, ±ω^{ν}, ±ω^{λ}) (±ω^{μ}, -±ω^{ν}, 0, ±ω^{λ}) (-±ω^{λ}, -±ω^{μ}, -±ω^{ν}, 0)	(±iω^{λ}√3, 0, 0, 0) (0, ±iω^{λ}√3, 0, 0) (0, 0, ±iω^{λ}√3, 0) (0, 0, 0, ±iω^{λ}√3)

where $\omega = \tfrac{-1+i\sqrt3}{2}, \lambda, \nu, \mu = 0,1,2$.

The last 6 points form hexagonal holes on one of its 40 diameters. There are 40 hyperplanes contain central _{3}{3}_{3}{4}_{2}, figures, with 72 vertices.

== Witting configuration ==
Coxeter named it after Alexander Witting for being a Witting configuration in complex projective 3-space:

$\left [\begin{smallmatrix} 40&12&12\\2&240&2\\12&12&40 \end{smallmatrix}\right ]$ or $\left [\begin{smallmatrix} 40&9&12\\4&90&4\\12&9&40 \end{smallmatrix}\right ]$

The Witting configuration is related to the finite space PG(3,2^{2}), consisting of 85 points, 357 lines, and 85 planes.

== Related real polytope ==
Its 240 vertices are shared with the real 8-dimensional polytope 4_{21},. Its 2160 3-edges are sometimes drawn as 6480 simple edges, slightly less than the 6720 edges of 4_{21}. The 240 difference is accounted by 40 central hexagons in 4_{21} whose edges are not included in _{3}{3}_{3}{3}_{3}{3}_{3}.

== The honeycomb of Witting polytopes ==
The regular Witting polytope has one further stage as a 4-dimensional honeycomb,. It has the Witting polytope as both its facets, and vertex figure. It is self-dual, and its dual coincides with itself.

Hyperplane sections of this honeycomb include 3-dimensional honeycombs.

The honeycomb of Witting polytopes has a real representation as the 8-dimensional polytope 5_{21},.

Its f-vector element counts are in proportion: 1, 80, 270, 80, 1. The configuration matrix for the honeycomb is:

L_{5}	k-face	f_{k}	f_{0}	f_{1}	f_{2}	f_{3}	f_{4}	k-figure	Notes
L_{4}	( )	f_{0}	N	240	2160	2160	240	_{3}{3}_{3}{3}_{3}{3}_{3}	L_{5}/L_{4} = N
L_{3}L_{1}	_{3}{ }	f_{1}	3	80N	27	72	27	_{3}{3}_{3}{3}_{3}	L_{5}/L_{3}L_{1} = 80N
L_{2}L_{2}	_{3}{3}_{3}	f_{2}	8	8	270N	8	8	_{3}{3}_{3}	L_{5}/L_{2}L_{2} = 270N
L_{3}L_{1}	_{3}{3}_{3}{3}_{3}	f_{3}	27	72	27	80N	3	_{3}{}	L_{5}/L_{3}L_{1} = 80N
L_{4}	_{3}{3}_{3}{3}_{3}{3}_{3}	f_{4}	240	2160	2160	240	N	( )	L_{5}/L_{4} = N
