= Charles Clayton Grove =

American mathematician

Charles Clayton Grove (1875–?) was an American mathematician who studied the Hesse group and the Hesse pencil.
