= Charles Grove (disambiguation) =

Charles Grove was a cricketer.

Charles Grove may also refer to:

- Charles Clayton Grove, mathematician
- Charles Grove, of the Grove baronets
- Charles Jake Grove (born 1980)

== See also ==
- Charles Groves (1915–1992), English conductor
