= Pseudoreflection =

In mathematics, a pseudoreflection is an invertible linear transformation of a finite-dimensional vector space such that it is not the identity transformation, has a finite (multiplicative) order, and fixes a hyperplane. The concept of pseudoreflection generalizes the concepts of reflection and complex reflection and is simply called reflection by some mathematicians. It plays an important role in Invariant theory of finite groups, including the Chevalley-Shephard-Todd theorem.

== Formal definition ==
Suppose that V is vector space over a field K, whose dimension is a finite number n. A pseudoreflection is an invertible linear transformation $g: V\to V$ such that the order of g is finite and the fixed subspace $V^g = \{ v\in V:\ gv=v \}$ of all vectors in V fixed by g has dimension n-1.

== Eigenvalues ==
A pseudoreflection g has an eigenvalue 1 of multiplicity n-1 and another eigenvalue r of multiplicity 1. Since g has finite order, the eigenvalue r must be a root of unity in the field K. It is possible that r = 1 (see Transvections).

== Diagonalizable pseudoreflections ==
Let p be the characteristic of the field K. If the order of g is coprime to p then g is diagonalizable and represented by a diagonal matrix

diag(1, ... , 1, r ) =
$$\begin{bmatrix}
1  &  0  &  0  & \cdots & 0      \\
0  &  1  &  0  & \cdots & 0      \\
\vdots & \vdots & \ddots & \vdots \\
0  &  0  &  \cdots & 1  & 0      \\
0  &  0  &  0  & \cdots & r      \\
\end{bmatrix}$$

where r is a root of unity not equal to 1. This includes the case when K is a field of characteristic zero, such as the field of real numbers and the field of complex numbers.

A diagonalizable pseudoreflection is sometimes called a semisimple reflection.

== Real reflections ==
When K is the field of real numbers, a pseudoreflection has matrix form diag(1, ... , 1, -1). A pseudoreflection with such matrix form is called a real reflection. If the space on which this transformation acts admits a symmetric bilinear form so that orthogonality of vectors can be defined, then the transformation is a true reflection.

== Complex reflections ==
When K is the field of complex numbers, a pseudoreflection is called a complex reflection, which can be represented by a diagonal matrix diag(1, ... , 1, r) where r is a complex root of unity unequal to 1.

== Transvections ==
If the pseudoreflection g is not diagonalizable then r = 1 and g has Jordan normal form

$$\begin{bmatrix}
1  &  0  &  0  & \cdots & 0      \\
0  &  1  &  0  & \cdots & 0      \\
\vdots & \vdots & \ddots & \vdots & \vdots \\
0  &  0  &  \cdots & 1  & 1      \\
0  &  0  &  0  & \cdots & 1      \\
\end{bmatrix}$$

In such case g is called a transvection. A pseudoreflection g is a transvection if and only if the characteristic p of the field K is positive and the order of g is p. Transvections are useful in the study of finite geometries and the classification of their groups of motions.
