= Complex group =

In mathematics, complex group may refer to:

- An archaic name for the symplectic group
- Complex reflection group
- A complex algebraic group
- A complex Lie group
