= Shepherd Group =

Shepherd group may refer to:

- Shepherd Building Group
- Shephard groups, in mathematics
- Shepherd Islands, Vanuatu
