= Möbius–Kantor polygon =

Möbius–Kantor polygon
The 8 3-edges (4 in red, 4 in green) projected symmetrically into 8 vertices of a square antiprism.
| Shephard symbol | 3(24)3 |
| Schläfli symbol | _{3}{3}_{3} |
| Coxeter diagram | |
| Edges | 8 _{3}{} |
| Vertices | 8 |
| Petrie polygon | Octagon |
| Shephard group | _{3}[3]_{3}, order 24 |
| Dual polyhedron | Self-dual |
| Properties | Regular |

In geometry, the Möbius–Kantor polygon is a regular complex polygon _{3}{3}_{3},, in $\mathbb{C}^2$. It has 8 vertices, and 8 edges. It is self-dual. Every vertex is shared by 3 triangular edges. Coxeter named it a Möbius–Kantor polygon for sharing the complex configuration structure as the Möbius–Kantor configuration, (8_{3}).

Discovered by G.C. Shephard in 1952, he represented it as 3(24)3, with its symmetry, Coxeter called as _{3}[3]_{3}, isomorphic to the binary tetrahedral group, order 24.

== Coordinates ==
The 8 vertex coordinates of this polygon can be given in $\mathbb{C}^3$, as:

| (ω,−1,0) | (0,ω,−ω^{2}) | (ω^{2},−1,0) | (−1,0,1) |
| (−ω,0,1) | (0,ω^{2},−ω) | (−ω^{2},0,1) | (1,−1,0) |

where $\omega = \tfrac{-1+i\sqrt3}{2}$.

== As a configuration ==
The configuration matrix for _{3}{3}_{3} is: $\left [\begin{smallmatrix}8&3\\3&8\end{smallmatrix}\right ]$

Its structure can be represented as a hypergraph, connecting 8 nodes by 8 3-node-set hyperedges.

== Real representation ==
It has a real representation as the 16-cell,, in 4-dimensional space, sharing the same 8 vertices. The 24 edges in the 16-cell are seen in the Möbius–Kantor polygon when the 8 triangular edges are drawn as 3-separate edges. The triangles are represented 2 sets of 4 red or blue outlines. The B_{4} projections are given in two different symmetry orientations between the two color sets.

Orthographic projections
| Plane | B_{4} | F_{4} |
|---|---|---|
| Graph | | |
| Symmetry | [8] | [12/3] |

The _{3}{3}_{3} polygon can be seen in a regular skew polyhedral net inside a 16-cell, with 8 vertices, 24 edges, 16 of its 32 faces. Alternate yellow triangular faces, interpreted as 3-edges, make two copies of the _{3}{3}_{3} polygon.

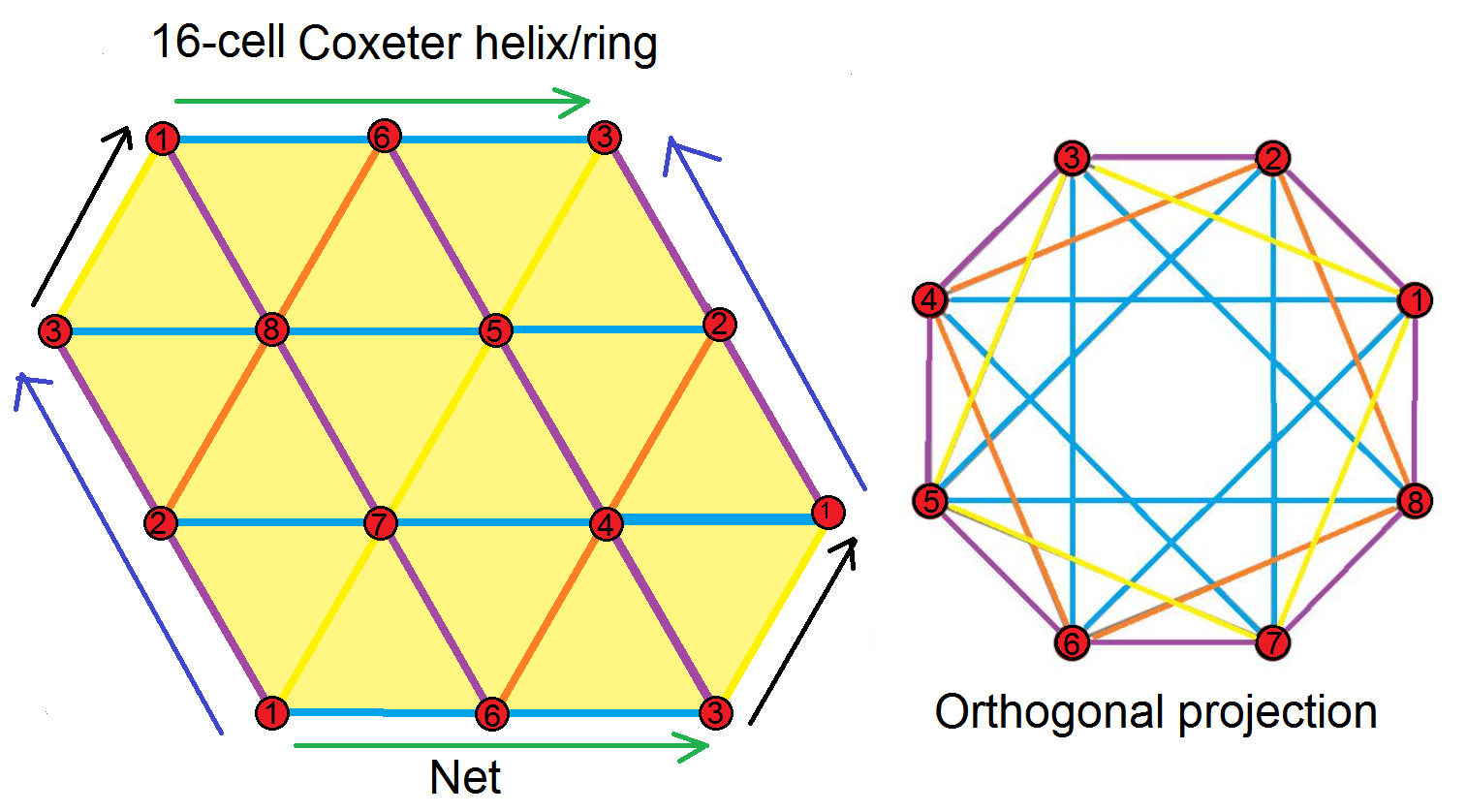

== Related polytopes ==
| This graph shows the two alternated polygons as a compound in red and blue _{3}{3}_{3} in dual positions. | _{3}{6}_{2}, or, with 24 vertices in black, and 16 3-edges colored in 2 sets of 3-edges in red and blue. |

It can also be seen as an alternation of, represented as. has 16 vertices, and 24 edges. A compound of two, in dual positions, and, can be represented as, contains all 16 vertices of.

The truncation, is the same as the regular polygon, _{3}{6}_{2},. Its edge-diagram is the cayley diagram for _{3}[3]_{3}.

The regular Hessian polyhedron _{3}{3}_{3}{3}_{3}, has this polygon as a facet and vertex figure.
