= Chevalley–Shephard–Todd theorem =

Mathematical theorem

In mathematics, the Chevalley–Shephard–Todd theorem in invariant theory of finite groups states that the ring of invariants of a finite group acting on a complex vector space is a polynomial ring if and only if the group is generated by pseudoreflections. In the case of subgroups of the complex general linear group the theorem was first proved by G. C. Shephard and J. A. Todd (1954) who gave a case-by-case proof. Claude Chevalley (1955) soon afterwards gave a uniform proof. It has been extended to finite linear groups over an arbitrary field in the non-modular case by Jean-Pierre Serre.

== Statement of the theorem ==
Let V be a finite-dimensional vector space over a field K and let G be a finite subgroup of the general linear group GL(V). An element s of GL(V) is called a pseudoreflection if it fixes a codimension 1 subspace of V and is not the identity transformation I, or equivalently, if the kernel Ker(s − I) has codimension one in V. Assume that the order of G is coprime to the characteristic of K (the so-called non-modular case). Then the following properties are equivalent:

- (A) The group G is generated by pseudoreflections.
- (B) The algebra of invariants K[V]^{G} is a (free) polynomial algebra.
- (B') The algebra of invariants K[V]^{G} is a regular ring.
- (C) The algebra K[V] is a free module over K[V]^{G}.
- (C') The algebra K[V] is a projective module over K[V]^{G}.

In the case when K is the field C of complex numbers, the first condition is usually stated as "G is a complex reflection group". Shephard and Todd derived a full classification of such groups.

== Examples ==
- Let V be one-dimensional. Then any finite group faithfully acting on V is a subgroup of the multiplicative group of the field K, and hence a cyclic group. It follows that G consists of roots of unity of order dividing n, where n is its order, so G is generated by pseudoreflections. In this case, K[V] = K[x] is the polynomial ring in one variable and the algebra of invariants of G is the subalgebra generated by x^{n}, hence it is a polynomial algebra.
- Let V = K^{n} be the standard n-dimensional vector space and G be the symmetric group S_{n} acting by permutations of the elements of the standard basis. The symmetric group is generated by transpositions (ij), which act by reflections on V. On the other hand, by the main theorem of symmetric functions, the algebra of invariants is the polynomial algebra generated by the elementary symmetric functions e_{1}, ..., e_{n}.
- Let V = K^{2} and G be the cyclic group of order 2 acting by ±I. In this case, G is not generated by pseudoreflections, since the nonidentity element s of G acts without fixed points, so that dim Ker(s − I) = 0. On the other hand, the algebra of invariants is the subalgebra of K[V] = K[x, y] generated by the homogeneous elements x^{2}, xy, and y^{2} of degree 2. This subalgebra is not a polynomial algebra because of the relation x^{2}y^{2} = (xy)^{2}.

== Generalizations ==
Broer (2007) gave an extension of the Chevalley–Shephard–Todd theorem to positive characteristic.

There has been much work on the question of when a reductive algebraic group acting on a vector space has a polynomial ring of invariants. In the case when the algebraic group is simple all cases when the invariant ring is polynomial have been classified by Schwarz (1978)

In general, the ring of invariants of a finite group acting linearly on a complex vector space is Cohen-Macaulay, so it is a finite-rank free module over a polynomial subring.
