= Hesse's theorem =

In geometry, Hesse's theorem, named for Otto Hesse, states that if two pairs of opposite vertices of a quadrilateral are conjugate with respect to some conic, then so is the third pair. A quadrilateral with this property is called a Hesse quadrilateral.
