= Otto Hesse =

German mathematician (1811–1874)

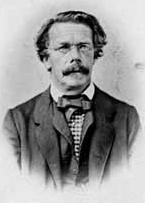
- Born: 22 April 1811; Königsberg, Kingdom of Prussia
- Died: 4 August 1874 (aged 63); Munich, Kingdom of Bavaria
- Education: Königsberg University
- Known for: Hessian curve Hessian matrix Hesse normal form Hesse configuration Hessian group Hessian pairs Hesse's theorem Hesse pencil Hesse's principle of transfer
- Scientific career
- Fields: Mathematician
- Workplaces: Polytechnic School
- Thesis: De octo punctis intersectionis trium superficium secundi ordinis (1840)
- Doctoral advisor: Carl Gustav Jacob Jacobi
- Doctoral students: Carl Neumann, Olaus Henrici, Gustav Kirchhoff, Jacob Lüroth, Adolph Mayer, Max Noether, and Ernst Schröder

Ludwig Otto Hesse (22 April 1811 – 4 August 1874) was a German mathematician. Hesse was born in Königsberg, Prussia, and died in Munich, Bavaria. He worked mainly on algebraic invariants, and geometry. The Hessian matrix, the Hesse normal form, the Hesse configuration, the Hessian group, Hessian pairs, Hesse's theorem, Hesse pencil, and the Hesse transfer principle are named after him. Many of Hesse's research findings were presented for the first time in Crelle's Journal or Hesse's textbooks.

== Life ==
Hesse was born in Königsberg (today Kaliningrad) as the son of Johann Gottlieb Hesse, a businessman and brewery owner and his wife Anna Karoline Reiter (1788–1865). He studied in his hometown at the Albertina under Carl Gustav Jacob Jacobi. Among his teachers were count Friedrich Wilhelm Bessel and Friedrich Julius Richelot. He earned his doctorate in 1840 at the University of Königsberg with the dissertation De octo punctis intersectionis trium superficium secundi ordinis. In 1841, Hesse completed his habilitation thesis. In the same year he married Sophie Marie Emilie Dulk, the daughter of pharmacists and chemistry professor Friedrich Philipp Dulk (1788–1852). The couple had a son and five daughters. Hesse taught for some time physics and chemistry at the Vocational School in Königsberg and lectured at the Albertina. In 1845 he was appointed associate professor in Königsberg. In 1855 he moved to Halle and in 1856 to Heidelberg until 1868, when he finally moved to Munich to the newly established Polytechnic School. In 1869 he joined the Bavarian Academy of Sciences.

His doctoral students include Olaus Henrici, Gustav Kirchhoff, Jacob Lüroth, Adolph Mayer, Carl Neumann, Max Noether, Ernst Schröder, and Heinrich Martin Weber.

== Works ==
- Vorlesungen über analytische Geometrie des Raumes. (Lectures on analytic geometry of space) Leipzig (3. A. 1876) (Internet Archive)
- Vorlesungen aus der analytischen Geometrie der geraden Linie, des Punktes und des Kreises. (Lectures from the analytical geometry of the straight line, the point and the circle) Leipzig (1881). Hrsg. A. Gundelfinger (Internet Archive)
- Die Determinanten elementar behandelt. (Determinants elementary treated) Leipzig (2. A. 1872) (Göttinger Digitalisierungszentrum)
- Die vier Species. (The four Species) Leipzig (1872) (Internet Archive)

His collected works were published in 1897 by Bavarian Academy of Sciences and Humanities.

- Hesse, Ludwig Otto (1972) [1897], Dyck, W.; Gundelfinger, S.; Lüroth, J.; et al. (eds.), Ludwig Otto Hesse's gesammelte Werke, New York: Chelsea Publishing Co., ISBN 978-0-8284-0261-3, MR 0392474 (Internet Archive)
