= Hessian pair =

In mathematics, a Hessian pair or Hessian duad, named for Otto Hesse, is a pair of points of the projective line canonically associated with a set of 3 points of the projective line. More generally, one can define the Hessian pair of any triple of elements from a set that can be identified with a projective line, such as a rational curve, a pencil of divisors, a pencil of lines, and so on.

== Definition ==
If {A, B, C} is a set of 3 distinct points of the projective line, then the Hessian pair is a set {P,Q} of two points that can be defined by any of the following properties:

- P and Q are the roots of the Hessian of the binary cubic form with roots A, B, C.
- P and Q are the two points fixed by the unique projective transformation taking A to B, B to C, and C to A.
- P and Q are the two points that when added to A, B, C form an equianharmonic set (a set of 4 points with cross-ratio a cube root of 1).
- P and Q are the images of 0 and ∞ under the projective transformation taking the three cube roots of 1 to A, B, C.

== Examples ==
Hesse points can be used to solve cubic equations as follows. If A, B, C are three roots of a cubic, then the Hesse points can be found as roots of a quadratic equation. If the Hesse points are then transformed to 0 and ∞ by a fractional linear transformation, the cubic equation is transformed to one of the form x^{3} = D.

== See also ==
- Glossary of classical algebraic geometry
