= Olaus Henrici =

German mathematician (1840–1918)

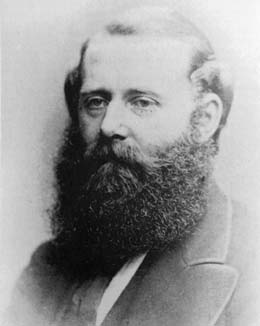
- Olaus Henrici (year unknown)
- Born: 9 March 1840; Meldorf, Duchy of Holstein
- Died: 10 August 1918 (aged 78); Chandler's Ford, England
- Education: Ruprecht-Karls-University Heidelberg
- Awards: Fellow of the Royal Society
- Scientific career
- Workplaces: University College London Bedford College, London Central Technical College
- Doctoral advisor: Otto Hesse
- Other academic advisors: Karl Weierstrass, Leopold Kronecker
- Notable students: G. B. Mathews; Raphael Weldon

Olaus Magnus Friedrich Erdmann Henrici, FRS (9 March 1840, Meldorf, Duchy of Holstein – 10 August 1918, Chandler's Ford, Hampshire, England) was a German mathematician who became a professor in London.

After three years as an apprentice in engineering, Henrici entered Karlsruhe Polytechnium where he came under the influence of Alfred Clebsch who encouraged him in mathematics. He then went to Heidelberg where he studied with Otto Hesse. Henrici attained his Dr. phil. degree on 6 June 1863 at University of Heidelberg. He continued his studies in Berlin with Karl Weierstrass and Leopold Kronecker. He was briefly docent of mathematics and physics at the University of Kiel, but ran into financial difficulties.

Henrici moved to London in 1865 where he worked as a private tutor. In 1869 Hesse introduced him to J. J. Sylvester who in turn brought him into contact with Arthur Cayley, William Kingdon Clifford, and Thomas Archer Hirst. It was Hirst that gave him some work at University College London. Henrici also became a professor at Bedford College. When Hirst fell ill, Henrici filled his position at University College. He held the position until 1884, turning to applied mathematics after 1880.

From 1882 to 1884 Henrici was President of the London Mathematical Society. In 1884 he moved to Central Technical College where he directed a Laboratory of Mechanics which included calculating machines, planimeters, moment integrators, and a harmonic analyzer.

Henrici was impressed by the work of Robert Stawell Ball in screw theory as presented in a German textbook by Gravelius. In 1890 Henrici wrote a book review for Nature outlining the program of the theory.

In 1911 he retired and took up gardening at Chandler's Ford in Hampshire.

== Works ==
- Skeleton Structures: Especially in Their Application to the Building of Steel & Iron Bridges. New York: Van Nostrand, 1867.
- Elementary Geometry: Congruent Figures. London: Longmans, Green, 1879.
- Elementary Geometry: Congruent Figures. London: Longmans, Green, second edition 1888.
- Vectors and rotors, 1903.
