= George Ballard Mathews =

British mathematician

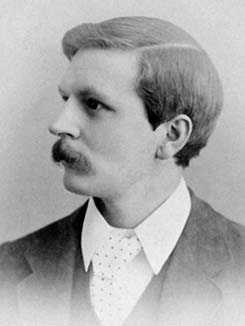

George Ballard Mathews, FRS (23 February 1861 – 19 March 1922) was an English mathematician.

He was born in London. He studied at the Ludlow Grammar School which had instruction in Hebrew and Sanskrit as well as in Greek and Latin. He proceeded to University College, London where Olaus Henrici made him "realise that mathematics is an inductive science, not a set of rules and formulae." He then took up preparation for Cambridge Mathematical Tripos under the guidance of William Henry Besant. He came out Senior Wrangler for 1883. He was elected a Fellow of St John's College.

In 1884 University College of North Wales was established under Principal Harry Reichel and Mathews as professor of mathematics. He taught alongside Andrew Gray, James Johnston Dobbie and Henry Stuart Jones. There he produced his first textbook Theory of Numbers. Part I (1892), an introduction to number theory. (It is likely that the book was studied by Ramanujan before he left for England in 1914.) In 1896, discouraged at the preparation and dedication of students, Mathews resigned and moved to Cambridge.

Mathews was elected to the Royal Society in 1897. He worked as University Lecturer at Cambridge University. In 1906 he resigned from Cambridge.

Returning to Bangor, Wales, he again took up teaching at University College of North Wales. He produced his book Algebraic Equations in 1907. His book on projective geometry (1914) is noted for its attention to foundations and its exposition of Karl von Staudt’s approach to imaginary units. In 1915 Glasgow University bestowed an honorary L.L.D. upon him. In 1922 he and Andrew Gray published a book on Bessel's functions.

Mathews was weakened by poor nutrition under the rationing due to World War I. He had surgery in 1919, a seizure in 1921, and never recovered. Describing his friend, Andrew Gray wrote that Mathews was "a classical scholar and deeply interested in philosophical questions of all kinds ... His mind was keen and tongue sharp." Gray also noted that Mathews was "exceedingly sensitive, and almost morbidly afraid of appearing to put himself forward in any way, so that he hardly received the recognition that was due him."

Mathews authored a large number of book reviews for the scientific journal Nature. These short essays gave him ample opportunity for expression. For example, under the title "Mathematics and Civilisation", reviewing three German monographs, he wrote, "history of culture ... change of habits of thought ... nothing whatever has contributed so much as the study of pure mathematics." He cites author A. Voss asserting that "mathematics is pre-eminently a creation of the spirit of man; it is his least restricted field of activity, and we are under a moral obligation to cultivate it." In 1916, in a review of Augustus De Morgan's A Budget of Paradoxes, Matthews predicts World War II and its nature:

England's contempt for science, which all who know have been protesting for a generation, will, if not amended, bring her down in sorrow to the ground, whatever the issue of the present war, which will be followed by one of much greater intensity, for which the weapons will be forged, not by hands, or machines, but by brains.
