= Hesse normal form =

Equation in analytic geometry

Distance from the origin O to the line E calculated with the Hesse normal form. Normal vector in red, line in green, point O shown in blue.

In analytic geometry, the Hesse normal form (named after Otto Hesse) is an equation used to describe a line in the Euclidean plane $\mathbb{R}^2$, a plane in Euclidean space $\mathbb{R}^3$, or a hyperplane in higher dimensions. It is primarily used for calculating distances (see point-plane distance and point-line distance).

It is written in vector notation as

$$\vec r \cdot \vec n_0 - d = 0.\,$$

The dot $\cdot$ indicates the dot product (or scalar product). Vector $\vec r$ points from the origin of the coordinate system, O, to any point P that lies precisely in plane or on line E. The vector $\vec n_0$ represents the unit normal vector of plane or line E. The distance $d \ge 0$ is the shortest distance from the origin O to the plane or line.

== Derivation/Calculation from the normal form ==
Note: For simplicity, the following derivation discusses the 3D case. However, it is also applicable in 2D.

In the normal form,

$$(\vec r -\vec a)\cdot \vec n = 0\,$$

a plane is given by a normal vector $\vec n$ as well as an arbitrary position vector $\vec a$ of a point $A \in E$. The direction of $\vec n$ is chosen to satisfy the following inequality

$$\vec a\cdot \vec n \geq 0\,$$

By dividing the normal vector $\vec n$ by its magnitude $| \vec n |$, we obtain the unit (or normalized) normal vector

$$\vec n_0 = {{\vec n} \over {| \vec n |}}\,$$

and the above equation can be rewritten as

$$(\vec r -\vec a)\cdot \vec n_0 = 0.\,$$

Substituting

$$d = \vec a\cdot \vec n_0 \geq 0\,$$

we obtain the Hesse normal form

$$\vec r \cdot \vec n_0 - d = 0.\,$$

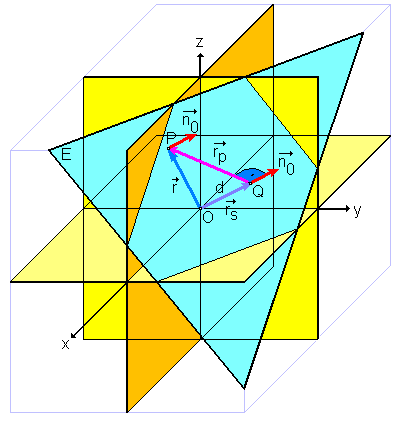

In this diagram, d is the distance from the origin. Because $\vec r \cdot \vec n_0 = d$ holds for every point in the plane, it is also true at point Q (the point where the vector from the origin meets the plane E), with $\vec r = \vec r_s$, per the definition of the Scalar product

$$d = \vec r_s \cdot \vec n_0 = |\vec r_s| \cdot |\vec n_0| \cdot \cos(0^\circ) = |\vec r_s| \cdot 1 = |\vec r_s|.\,$$

The magnitude $|\vec r_s|$ of ${\vec r_s}$ is the shortest distance from the origin to the plane.

== Distance to a line ==
The Quadrance (distance squared) from a line $ax + by + c = 0$ to a point $(x, y)$ is

$$\frac{(ax+by+c)^2}{a^2 + b^2}.$$

If $(a, b)$ has unit length then this becomes $(ax+by+c)^2.$
