= Hesse's principle of transfer =

Geometric theorem

In geometry, Hesse's principle of transfer (German: Übertragungsprinzip) states that if the points of the projective line P^{1} are depicted by a rational normal curve in P^{n}, then the group of the projective transformations of P^{n} that preserve the curve is isomorphic to the group of the projective transformations of P^{1} (this is a generalization of the original Hesse's principle, in a form suggested by Wilhelm Franz Meyer). It was originally introduced by Otto Hesse in 1866, in a more restricted form. It influenced Felix Klein in the development of the Erlangen program. Since its original conception, it was generalized by many mathematicians, including Klein, Fano, and Cartan. This principle establishes a bijection between the points in the plane and pairs of points belonging to a line. Assuming this correspondence, it states that for every theorem one proves in plane geometry, there is a corresponding theorem obtained by transfer in line geometry (and vice versa).
