= Hessian group =

In mathematics, the Hessian group is a finite group of order 216, introduced by Jordan (1877) who named it for Otto Hesse. It may be represented as the group of affine transformations with determinant 1 of the affine plane over the finite field of 3 elements. It has a normal subgroup that is an elementary abelian group of order 3^{2}, and the quotient by this subgroup is isomorphic to the group SL_{2}(3) of order 24. It also acts on the Hesse pencil of elliptic curves, and forms the automorphism group of the Hesse configuration of the 9 inflection points of these curves and the 12 lines through triples of these points.

The triple cover of this group is a complex reflection group, _{3}[3]_{3}[3]_{3} or of order 648, and the product of this with a group of order 2 is another complex reflection group, _{3}[3]_{3}[4]_{2} or of order 1296.
