= Christian Gustav Adolph Mayer =

German mathematician

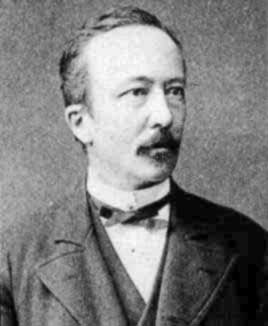
Christian Gustav Adolph Mayer.

Christian Gustav Adolph Mayer (15 February 1839 – 11 April 1908) was a German mathematician.

Mayer was born on February 15, 1839, in Leipzig, Germany. His father was a businessman from Leipzig. He studied at the University of Leipzig, University of Göttingen, University of Heidelberg and University of Königsberg. He completed his doctorate from the University of Heidelberg in 1861.

When Mayer was studying at Heidelberg, he submitted his habilitation thesis to the University of Heidelberg. He gained the permission to teach at universities in 1866. He taught mathematics at the University of Heidelberg for the rest of his life. He did research on differential equations, the calculus of variations and mechanics. His research on the integration of partial differential equations and a search to determine maxima and minima using variational methods brought him close to the investigations that Sophus Lie was carrying out around the same time.

Several letters were exchanged between Mayer and mathematician Felix Klein from 1871 to 1907. Those letters provide insights into the scientific and personal relations among Felix Klein, Mayer and Lie over the period.

Mayer's students included Friedrich Engel, Felix Hausdorff and Gerhard Kowalewski.
