= Hesse pencil =

Curves in the Hesse pencil of cubic curves $x^3+y^3+z^3=3kxyz$, as seen in a symmetric view of the projective plane in which the lines $x,y,z=0$ form an equilateral triangle with the point 1:1:1 at its center, and the line $x+y+z=0$ forms the line at infinity. Different colors represent different curves in the pencil, corresponding to different choices of the parameter $k$: The three black lines forming an equilateral triangle represent the degenerate case $xyz=0$ corresponding to $k=\infty$.; The black point in the center is an isolated point from the degenerate case $k=1$. It has as its roots the point 1:1:1 (shown, from a quadratic factor) and the line at infinity (not shown, from a linear factor).; The blue and green curves represent choices of $k$ with $k>1$, forming two ovals in the real projective plane: a central oval inside the equilateral triangle, and an external oval with three inflection points at infinity, separating it into three real branches. The choices of $k$ for the blue curves are (from lighter to darker) 36, 12, 6, 4, and 3. For the green curves, only the central oval is visible; their parameters are (from lighter to darker) 2, 1.5, 1.25, and 1.1; The red curves represent choices of $k$ with $k<1$, having only a single oval with the same three inflection points and three real branches. Their choices of $k$ are (from lighter to darker) –8, –2, –1, –0.5, 0.

In mathematics, the syzygetic pencil or Hesse pencil, named for Otto Hesse, is a pencil (one-dimensional family) of cubic plane curves in the complex projective plane, defined by the equation
$$x^3+y^3+z^3 - \lambda xyz =0.$$
Each curve in the pencil is determined by the parameter $\lambda$ and consists of the points in the plane whose homogeneous coordinates $(x:y:z)$ satisfy the equation.

The limit of the curves when $\lambda$ tends to infinity is the triplet of lines of equation $xyz=0$. So, it is generally not included in the pencil. For $\lambda=3\zeta_3^j$ and $0 \leq j \leq 2$, where $\zeta_3$ is a primitive third root of unity, the curve has a singular point at $(\zeta_3^j:1:1)$ and is a union of three lines intersecting pairwise. Otherwise, the curve is non sigular and has $(0:-1:1)$, $(1:0:-1)$, and $(1:-1:0)$ as inflexion points. It is thus an elliptic curve.

Each curve in the pencil passes through the nine points of the complex projective plane whose homogeneous coordinates are some permutation of 0, –1, and a cube root of unity. The Hesse pencil is thus the family of the cubic passing through these nine points. If one works over any field of characteristic different from three, this remains true except it may occur that these points are defined over an extension of the field. This does not work in characteristics 3, since, in this case, the points are not all distinct.

The nine common points of the Hesse pencil are the inflection points of each of the nonsingular cubic in the pencil. Any line that passes through at least two of these nine points passes through exactly three of them; the nine points and twelve lines through triples of points form the Hesse configuration.

Given a nonsingular cubic plane curve, there Every elliptic curve is birationally equivalent to a curve of the Hesse pencil; this is the Hessian form of an elliptic curve. However, the parameters ($\lambda,\mu$) of the Hessian form may belong to an extension field of the field of definition of the original curve.
