= Complex reflection group =

Concept in mathematics

In mathematics, a complex reflection group is a finite group acting on a finite-dimensional complex vector space that is generated by complex reflections: non-trivial elements that fix a complex hyperplane pointwise.

Complex reflection groups arise in the study of the invariant theory of polynomial rings. In the mid-20th century, they were completely classified in work of Shephard and Todd. Special cases include the symmetric group of permutations, the dihedral groups, and more generally all finite real reflection groups (the Coxeter groups or Weyl groups, including the symmetry groups of regular polyhedra).

== Definition ==
A (complex) reflection r (sometimes also called pseudo reflection or unitary reflection) of a finite-dimensional complex vector space V is an element $r \in GL(V)$ of finite order that fixes a complex hyperplane pointwise, that is, the fixed-space $\operatorname{Fix}(r) := \operatorname{ker}(r-\operatorname{Id}_V)$ has codimension 1.

A (finite) complex reflection group $W \subseteq GL(V)$ is a finite subgroup of $GL(V)$ that is generated by reflections.

== Properties ==
Any real reflection group becomes a complex reflection group if we extend the scalars from R to C. In particular, all finite Coxeter groups or Weyl groups give examples of complex reflection groups.

A complex reflection group W is irreducible if the only W-invariant proper subspace of the corresponding vector space is the origin. In this case, the dimension of the vector space is called the rank of W.

The Coxeter number $h$ of an irreducible complex reflection group W of rank $n$ is defined as $h = \frac{|\mathcal{R}|+|\mathcal{A}|}{n}$ where $\mathcal{R}$ denotes the set of reflections and $\mathcal{A}$ denotes the set of reflecting hyperplanes. In the case of real reflection groups, this definition reduces to the usual definition of the Coxeter number for finite Coxeter systems.

== Classification ==
Any complex reflection group is a product of irreducible complex reflection groups, acting on the sum of the corresponding vector spaces. So it is sufficient to classify the irreducible complex reflection groups.

The irreducible complex reflection groups were classified by Geoffrey Colin Shephard and J. A. Todd. They proved that every irreducible belonged to an infinite family G(m, p, n) depending on 3 positive integer parameters (with p dividing m) or was one of 34 exceptional cases, which they numbered from 4 to 37. The group G(m, 1, n) is the generalized symmetric group; equivalently, it is the wreath product of the symmetric group Sym(n) by a cyclic group of order m. As a matrix group, its elements may be realized as monomial matrices whose nonzero elements are mth roots of unity.

The group G(m, p, n) is an index-p subgroup of G(m, 1, n). G(m, p, n) is of order m^{n}n!/p. As matrices, it may be realized as the subset in which the product of the nonzero entries is an (m/p)th root of unity (rather than just an mth root). Algebraically, G(m, p, n) is a semidirect product of an abelian group of order m^{n}/p by the symmetric group Sym(n); the elements of the abelian group are of the form (θ^{a_{1}}, θ^{a_{2}}, ..., θ^{a_{n}}), where θ is a primitive mth root of unity and Σa_{i} ≡ 0 mod p, and Sym(n) acts by permutations of the coordinates.

The group G(m,p,n) acts irreducibly on C^{n} except in the cases m = 1, n > 1 (the symmetric group) and G(2, 2, 2) (the Klein four-group). In these cases, C^{n} splits as a sum of irreducible representations of dimensions 1 and n − 1.

=== Special cases of G(m, p, n) ===
==== Coxeter groups ====
When m = 2, the representation described in the previous section consists of matrices with real entries, and hence in these cases G(m,p,n) is a finite Coxeter group. In particular:

- G(1, 1, n) has type A_{n−1} = [3,3,...,3,3] =...; the symmetric group of order n!
- G(2, 1, n) has type B_{n} = [3,3,...,3,4] =...; the hyperoctahedral group of order 2^{n}n!
- G(2, 2, n) has type D_{n} = [3,3,...,3^{1,1}] =..., order 2^{n}n!/2.

In addition, when m = p and n = 2, the group G(p, p, 2) is the dihedral group of order 2p; as a Coxeter group, type I_{2}(p) = [p] = (and the Weyl group G_{2} when p = 6).

==== Other special cases and coincidences ====
The only cases when two groups G(m, p, n) are isomorphic as complex reflection groups are that G(ma, pa, 1) is isomorphic to G(mb, pb, 1) for any positive integers a, b (and both are isomorphic to the cyclic group of order m/p). However, there are other cases when two such groups are isomorphic as abstract groups.

The groups G(3, 3, 2) and G(1, 1, 3) are isomorphic to the symmetric group Sym(3). The groups G(2, 2, 3) and G(1, 1, 4) are isomorphic to the symmetric group Sym(4). Both G(2, 1, 2) and G(4, 4, 2) are isomorphic to the dihedral group of order 8. And the groups G(2p, p, 1) are cyclic of order 2, as is G(1, 1, 2).

== List of irreducible complex reflection groups ==
There are a few duplicates in the first 3 lines of this list; see the previous section for details.

- ST is the Shephard–Todd number of the reflection group.
- Rank is the dimension of the complex vector space the group acts on.
- Structure describes the structure of the group. The symbol * stands for a central product of two groups. For rank 2, the quotient by the (cyclic) center is the group of rotations of a tetrahedron, octahedron, or icosahedron (T = Alt(4), O = Sym(4), I = Alt(5), of orders 12, 24, 60), as stated in the table. For the notation 2^{1+4}, see extra special group.
- Order is the number of elements of the group.
- Reflections describes the number of reflections: 2^{6}4^{12} means that there are 6 reflections of order 2 and 12 of order 4.
- Degrees gives the degrees of the fundamental invariants of the ring of polynomial invariants. For example, the invariants of group number 4 form a polynomial ring with 2 generators of degrees 4 and 6.

Irreducible complex reflection groups
ST	Rank	Structure and names	Coxeter names	Order	Reflections	Degrees	Codegrees
1	n−1	Symmetric group G(1,1,n) = Sym(n)		n!	2^{n(n − 1)/2}	2, 3, ...,n	0,1,...,n − 2
2	n	G(m,p,n) m > 1, n > 1, p|m (G(2,2,2) is reducible)		m^{n}n!/p	2^{mn(n−1)/2},d^{nφ(d)} (d|m/p, d > 1)	m,2m,..,(n − 1)m; mn/p	0,m,..., (n − 1)m if p < m; 0,m,...,(n − 2)m, (n − 1)m − n if p = m
2	2	G(p,1,2) p > 1,	p[4]2 or	2p^{2}	2^{p},d^{2φ(d)} (d|p, d > 1)	p; 2p	0,p
2	2	Dihedral group G(p,p,2) p > 2	[p] or	2p	2^{p}	2,p	0,p-2
3	1	Cyclic group G(p,1,1) = Z_{p}	p[] or	p	d^{φ(d)} (d|p, d > 1)	p	0
4	2	W(L_{2}), Z_{2}.T	3[3]3 or, ⟨2,3,3⟩	24	3^{8}	4,6	0,2
5	2	Z_{6}.T	3[4]3 or	72	3^{16}	6,12	0,6
6	2	Z_{4}.T	3[6]2 or	48	2^{6}3^{8}	4,12	0,8
7	2	Z_{12}.T	‹3,3,3›_{2} or ⟨2,3,3⟩_{6}	144	2^{6}3^{16}	12,12	0,12
8	2	Z_{4}.O	4[3]4 or	96	2^{6}4^{12}	8,12	0,4
9	2	Z_{8}.O	4[6]2 or or ⟨2,3,4⟩_{4}	192	2^{18}4^{12}	8,24	0,16
10	2	Z_{12}.O	4[4]3 or	288	2^{6}3^{16}4^{12}	12,24	0,12
11	2	Z_{24}.O	⟨2,3,4⟩_{12}	576	2^{18}3^{16}4^{12}	24,24	0,24
12	2	Z_{2}.O= GL_{2}(F_{3})	⟨2,3,4⟩	48	2^{12}	6,8	0,10
13	2	Z_{4}.O	⟨2,3,4⟩_{2}	96	2^{18}	8,12	0,16
14	2	Z_{6}.O	3[8]2 or	144	2^{12}3^{16}	6,24	0,18
15	2	Z_{12}.O	⟨2,3,4⟩_{6}	288	2^{18}3^{16}	12,24	0,24
16	2	Z_{10}.I, ⟨2,3,5⟩×Z_{5}	5[3]5 or	600	5^{48}	20,30	0,10
17	2	Z_{20}.I	5[6]2 or	1200	2^{30}5^{48}	20,60	0,40
18	2	Z_{30}.I	5[4]3 or	1800	3^{40}5^{48}	30,60	0,30
19	2	Z_{60}.I	⟨2,3,5⟩_{30}	3600	2^{30}3^{40}5^{48}	60,60	0,60
20	2	Z_{6}.I	3[5]3 or	360	3^{40}	12,30	0,18
21	2	Z_{12}.I	3[10]2 or	720	2^{30}3^{40}	12,60	0,48
22	2	Z_{4}.I	⟨2,3,5⟩_{2}	240	2^{30}	12,20	0,28
23	3	W(H_{3}) = Z_{2} × PSL_{2}(5)	[5,3],	120	2^{15}	2,6,10	0,4,8
24	3	W(J_{3}(4)) = Z_{2} × PSL_{2}(7), Klein	[1 1 1^{4}]^{4},	336	2^{21}	4,6,14	0,8,10
25	3	W(L_{3}) = W(P_{3}) = 3^{1+2}.SL_{2}(3) Hessian	3[3]3[3]3,	648	3^{24}	6,9,12	0,3,6
26	3	W(M_{3}) =Z_{2} ×3^{1+2}.SL_{2}(3) Hessian	2[4]3[3]3,	1296	2^{9} 3^{24}	6,12,18	0,6,12
27	3	W(J_{3}(5)) = Z_{2} ×(Z_{3}.Alt(6)), Valentiner	[1 1 1^{5}]^{4}, [1 1 1^{4}]^{5},	2160	2^{45}	6,12,30	0,18,24
28	4	W(F_{4}) = (SL_{2}(3)* SL_{2}(3)).(Z_{2} × Z_{2})	[3,4,3],	1152	2^{12+12}	2,6,8,12	0,4,6,10
29	4	W(N_{4}) = (Z_{4}*2^{1 + 4}).Sym(5)	[1 1 2]^{4},	7680	2^{40}	4,8,12,20	0,8,12,16
30	4	W(H_{4}) = (SL_{2}(5)*SL_{2}(5)).Z_{2}	[5,3,3],	14400	2^{60}	2,12,20,30	0,10,18,28
31	4	W(EN_{4}) = W(O_{4}) = (Z_{4}*2^{1 + 4}).Sp_{4}(2)		46080	2^{60}	8,12,20,24	0,12,16,28
32	4	W(L_{4}) = Z_{3} × Sp_{4}(3)	3[3]3[3]3[3]3,	155520	3^{80}	12,18,24,30	0,6,12,18
33	5	W(K_{5}) = Z_{2} ×Ω_{5}(3) = Z_{2} × PSp_{4}(3)= Z_{2} × PSU_{4}(2)	[1 2 2]^{3},	51840	2^{45}	4,6,10,12,18	0,6,8,12,14
34	6	W(K_{6})= Z_{3}.Ω^{−}_{6}(3).Z_{2}, Mitchell's group	[1 2 3]^{3},	39191040	2^{126}	6,12,18,24,30,42	0,12,18,24,30,36
35	6	W(E_{6}) = SO_{5}(3) = O^{−}_{6}(2) = PSp_{4}(3).Z_{2} = PSU_{4}(2).Z_{2}	[3^{2,2,1}],	51840	2^{36}	2,5,6,8,9,12	0,3,4,6,7,10
36	7	W(E_{7}) = Z_{2} ×Sp_{6}(2)	[3^{3,2,1}],	2903040	2^{63}	2,6,8,10,12,14,18	0,4,6,8,10,12,16
37	8	W(E_{8})= Z_{2}.O^{+}_{8}(2)	[3^{4,2,1}],	696729600	2^{120}	2,8,12,14,18,20,24,30	0,6,10,12,16,18,22,28

== Degrees ==
Shephard and Todd proved that a finite group acting on a complex vector space is a complex reflection group if and only if its ring of invariants is a polynomial ring (Chevalley–Shephard–Todd theorem). For $\ell$ being the rank of the reflection group, the degrees $d_1 \leq d_2 \leq \ldots \leq d_\ell$ of the generators of the ring of invariants are called degrees of W and are listed in the column above headed "degrees". They also showed that many other invariants of the group are determined by the degrees as follows:

- The center of an irreducible reflection group is cyclic of order equal to the greatest common divisor of the degrees.
- The order of a complex reflection group is the product of its degrees.
- The number of reflections is the sum of the degrees minus the rank.
- An irreducible complex reflection group comes from a real reflection group if and only if it has an invariant of degree 2.
- The degrees d_{i} satisfy the formula $\prod_{i=1}^\ell(q+d_i-1)= \sum_{w\in W}q^{\dim(V^w)}.$

== Codegrees ==
For $\ell$ being the rank of the reflection group, the codegrees $d^*_1 \geq d^*_2 \geq \ldots \geq d^*_\ell$ of W can be defined by $\prod_{i=1}^\ell(q-d^*_i-1)= \sum_{w\in W}\det(w)q^{\dim(V^w)}.$

- For a real reflection group, the codegrees are the degrees minus 2.
- The number of reflection hyperplanes is the sum of the codegrees plus the rank.

== Well-generated complex reflection groups ==
By definition, every complex reflection group is generated by its reflections. The set of reflections is not a minimal generating set, however, and every irreducible complex reflection group of rank n has a minimal generating set consisting of either n or n + 1 reflections. In the former case, the group is said to be well-generated.

The property of being well-generated is equivalent to the condition $d_i + d^*_i = d_\ell$ for all $1 \leq i \leq \ell$. Thus, for example, one can read off from the classification that the group G(m, p, n) is well-generated if and only if p = 1 or m.

For irreducible well-generated complex reflection groups, the Coxeter number h defined above equals the largest degree, $h = d_\ell$. A reducible complex reflection group is said to be well-generated if it is a product of irreducible well-generated complex reflection groups. Every finite real reflection group is well-generated.

== Shephard groups ==
The well-generated complex reflection groups include a subset called the Shephard groups. These groups are the symmetry groups of regular complex polytopes. In particular, they include the symmetry groups of regular real polyhedra. The Shephard groups may be characterized as the complex reflection groups that admit a "Coxeter-like" presentation with a linear diagram. That is, a Shephard group has associated positive integers p_{1}, ..., p_{n} and q_{1}, ..., q_{n − 1} such that there is a generating set s_{1}, ..., s_{n} satisfying the relations

$(s_i)^{p_i} = 1$ for i = 1, ..., n,
$s_i s_j = s_j s_i$ if $|i - j| > 1$,

and

$s_i s_{i + 1}s_i s_{i + 1} \cdots = s_{i + 1}s_i s_{i + 1}s_i \cdots$ where the products on both sides have q_{i} terms, for i = 1, ..., n − 1.

This information is sometimes collected in the Coxeter-type symbol p_{1}[q_{1}]p_{2}[q_{2}] ... [q_{n − 1}]p_{n}, as seen in the table above.

Among groups in the infinite family G(m, p, n), the Shephard groups are those in which p = 1. There are also 18 exceptional Shephard groups, of which three are real.

== Cartan matrices ==
An extended Cartan matrix defines the unitary group. Shephard groups of rank n group have n generators. Ordinary Cartan matrices have diagonal elements 2, while unitary reflections do not have this restriction. For example, the rank 1 group of order p (with symbols p[],) is defined by the 1 × 1 matrix $\left[1-e^{2\pi i/p}\right]$.

Given: $\zeta_p = e^{2\pi i/p}, \omega = \zeta_3 = e^{2\pi i/3} = \tfrac{1}{2}(-1+i\sqrt{3}), \zeta_4 = e^{2\pi i/4} = i, \zeta_5 = e^{2\pi i/5} = \tfrac{1}{4}(\left(\sqrt5-1\right) + i\sqrt{2(5+\sqrt5)}), \tau = \tfrac{1+\sqrt5}{2}, \lambda = \tfrac{1+i\sqrt7}{2}, \omega = \tfrac{-1+i\sqrt3}{2}$.

Rank 1
Group	Cartan	Group	Cartan
2[]	$$\left [\begin{matrix}2\end{matrix} \right ]$$	3[]	$$\left [\begin{matrix}1-\omega\end{matrix}\right ]$$
4[]	$$\left [\begin{matrix}1-i\end{matrix}\right ]$$	5[]	$$\left [\begin{matrix}1-\zeta_5\end{matrix}\right ]$$

Rank 2
Group		Cartan	Group		Cartan
G_{4}	3[3]3	$\left [\begin{smallmatrix}1-\omega&1\\-\omega&1-\omega\end{smallmatrix}\right ]$	G_{5}	3[4]3	$\left [\begin{smallmatrix}1-\omega&1\\-2\omega&1-\omega\end{smallmatrix}\right ]$
G_{6}	2[6]3	$\left [\begin{smallmatrix}2&1\\1-\omega+i\omega^2&1-\omega\end{smallmatrix}\right ]$	G_{8}	4[3]4	$\left [\begin{smallmatrix}1-i&1\\-i&1-i\end{smallmatrix}\right ]$
G_{9}	2[6]4	$\left [\begin{smallmatrix}2&1\\(1+\sqrt2)\zeta_8&1+i\end{smallmatrix}\right ]$	G_{10}	3[4]4	$\left [\begin{smallmatrix}1-\omega&1\\-i-\omega&1-i\end{smallmatrix}\right ]$
G_{14}	3[8]2	$\left [\begin{smallmatrix}1-\omega&1\\1-\omega+\omega^2\sqrt2&2\end{smallmatrix}\right ]$	G_{16}	5[3]5	$\left [\begin{smallmatrix}1-\zeta_5&1\\-\zeta_5&1-\zeta_5\end{smallmatrix}\right ]$
G_{17}	2[6]5	$\left [\begin{smallmatrix}2&1\\1-\zeta_5-i\zeta^3&1-\zeta_5\end{smallmatrix}\right ]$	G_{18}	3[4]5	$\left [\begin{smallmatrix}1-\omega&1\\-\omega-\zeta_5&1-\zeta_5\end{smallmatrix}\right ]$
G_{20}	3[5]3	$\left [\begin{smallmatrix}1-\omega&1\\\omega(\tau-2)&1-\omega\end{smallmatrix}\right ]$	G_{21}	2[10]3	$\left [\begin{smallmatrix}2&1\\1-\omega-i\omega^2\tau&1-\omega\end{smallmatrix}\right ]$

Rank 3
Group		Cartan	Group		Cartan
G_{22}	<5,3,2>_{2}	$\left [\begin{smallmatrix}2&\tau+i-1&-i+1\\-\tau-i-1&2&i\\i-1&-i&2\end{smallmatrix}\right ]$	G_{23}	[5,3]	$\left [\begin{smallmatrix}2&-\tau&0\\-\tau&2&-1\\0&-1&2\end{smallmatrix}\right ]$
G_{24}	[1 1 1^{4}]^{4}	$\left [\begin{smallmatrix}2&-1&-\lambda\\-1&2&-1\\1+\lambda&-1&2\end{smallmatrix}\right ]$	G_{25}	3[3]3[3]3	$\left [\begin{smallmatrix}1-\omega&\omega^2&0\\-\omega^2&1-\omega&-\omega^2\\0&\omega^2&1-\omega\end{smallmatrix}\right ]$
G_{26}	3[3]3[4]2	$\left [\begin{smallmatrix}1-\omega&-\omega^2&0\\\omega^2&1-\omega&-1\\0&-1+\omega&2\end{smallmatrix}\right ]$	G_{27}	[1 1 1^{5}]^{4}	$\left [\begin{smallmatrix}2&-\tau&-\omega\\-\tau&2&-\omega^2\\-\omega^2&\omega&2\end{smallmatrix}\right ]$

Rank 4
Group		Cartan	Group		Cartan
G_{28}	[3,4,3]	$\left [\begin{smallmatrix}2&-1&0&0\\-1&2&-2&0\\0&-1&2&-1\\0&0&-1&2\end{smallmatrix}\right ]$	G_{29}	[1 1 2]^{4}	$\left [\begin{smallmatrix}2&-1&i+1&0\\-1&2&-i&0\\-i+1&i&2&-1\\0&0&-1&2\end{smallmatrix}\right ]$
G_{30}	[5,3,3]	$\left [\begin{smallmatrix}2&-\tau&0&0\\-\tau&2&-1&0\\0&-1&2&-1\\0&0&-1&2\end{smallmatrix}\right ]$	G_{32}	3[3]3[3]3	$\left [\begin{smallmatrix}1-\omega&\omega^2&0&0\\-\omega^2&1-\omega&-\omega^2&0\\0&\omega^2&1-\omega&\omega^2\\0&0&-\omega^2&1-\omega\end{smallmatrix}\right ]$

Rank 5
Group		Cartan	Group		Cartan
G_{31}	O_{4}	$\left [\begin{smallmatrix}2&-1&i+1&0&-i+1\\-1&2&-i&0&0\\-i+1&i&2&-1&-i+1\\0&0&-1&2&-1\\i+1&0&i+1&-1&2\end{smallmatrix}\right ]$	G_{33}	[1 2 2]^{3}	$\left [\begin{smallmatrix}2&-1&0&0&0\\-1&2&-1&-1&0\\0&-1&2&-\omega&0\\0&-1&-\omega^2&2&-\omega^2\\0&0&0&-\omega&2\end{smallmatrix}\right ]$

== See also ==
- Parabolic subgroup of a reflection group
