= C-normal subgroup =

In mathematics, in the field of group theory, a subgroup $H$ of a group $G$ is called c-normal if there is a normal subgroup $T$ of $G$ such that $HT = G$ and the intersection of $H$ and $T$ lies inside the normal core of $H$.

For a weakly c-normal subgroup, we only require $T$ to be subnormal.

Here are some facts about c-normal subgroups:

- Every normal subgroup is c-normal
- Every retract is c-normal
- Every c-normal subgroup is weakly c-normal
