= Modular subgroup =

In mathematics, in the field of group theory, a modular subgroup is a subgroup that is a modular element in the lattice of subgroups, where the meet operation is defined by the intersection and the join operation is defined by the subgroup generated by the union of subgroups.

By the modular property of groups, every quasinormal subgroup (that is, a subgroup that permutes with all subgroups) is modular. In particular, every normal subgroup is modular.
