= Malnormal subgroup =

In group theory, a subgroup $H$ of a group $G$ is termed malnormal if for any group element $x$ not in $H$, $H$ and $xHx^{-1}$ intersect only in the identity element.

Some facts about malnormality:

- The intersection of malnormal subgroups is malnormal.
- Malnormality is transitive; that is, a malnormal subgroup of a malnormal subgroup is malnormal.
- The trivial subgroup and the whole group are malnormal subgroups. A normal subgroup that is also malnormal must be one of these.
- Every malnormal subgroup is a special type of C-group called a trivial intersection subgroup, or TI subgroup.

When $G$ is finite, a malnormal subgroup $H$ distinct from 1 and $G$ is called a "Frobenius complement". The set $N$ of elements of $G$ which are either equal to 1 or non-conjugate to any element of $H$ is a normal subgroup of $G$, called the "Frobenius kernel", and $G$ is the semidirect product of $H$ and $N$.
