= CEP subgroup =

In mathematics, in the field of group theory, a subgroup of a group is said to have the Congruence Extension Property or to be a CEP subgroup if every congruence on the subgroup lifts to a congruence of the whole group. Equivalently, every normal subgroup of the subgroup arises as the intersection with the subgroup of a normal subgroup of the whole group.

In symbols, a subgroup $H$ is a CEP subgroup in a group $G$ if every normal subgroup $N$ of $H$ can be realized as $H \cap M$ where $M$ is normal in $G$.

The following facts are known about CEP subgroups:

- Every retract has the CEP.
- Every transitively normal subgroup has the CEP.
