= Lattice of subgroups =

Lattice whose elements are the subgroups of a given group

Hasse diagram of the lattice of subgroups of the dihedral group Dih_{4}, with the subgroups represented by their cycle graphs

In mathematics, the lattice of subgroups of a group $G$ is the lattice whose elements are the subgroups of $G$, with the partial ordering being set inclusion. In this lattice, the join of two subgroups is the subgroup generated by their union, and the meet of two subgroups is their intersection.

== Example ==
The dihedral group Dih_{4} has ten subgroups, counting itself and the trivial subgroup. Five of the eight group elements generate subgroups of order two, and the other two non-identity elements both generate the same cyclic subgroup of order four. In addition, there are two subgroups of the form Z_{2} × Z_{2}, generated by pairs of order-two elements. The lattice formed by these ten subgroups is shown in the illustration.

This example also shows that the lattice of all subgroups of a group is not a modular lattice in general. Indeed, this particular lattice contains the forbidden "pentagon" N_{5} as a sublattice.

== Properties ==
For any A, B, and C subgroups of a group with A ≤ C (A a subgroup of C) then AB ∩ C = A(B ∩ C); the multiplication here is the product of subgroups. This property has been called the modular property of groups (Aschbacher 2000) or (Dedekind's) modular law (Robinson 1996, Cohn 2000). Since for two normal subgroups the product is actually the smallest subgroup containing the two, the normal subgroups form a modular lattice.

The lattice theorem establishes a Galois connection between the lattice of subgroups of a group and that of its quotients.

The Zassenhaus lemma gives an isomorphism between certain combinations of quotients and products in the lattice of subgroups.

As groups are algebraic structures, it follows by a general Theorem (Burris & Sankappanavar 2011, p. 33) that their lattices of subgroups are algebraic lattices. This means that they are complete and compactly generated. However in general, there is no restriction on the possible sublattices of the lattice of subgroups, in the sense that every lattice is isomorphic to a sublattice of the subgroup lattice of some group. Furthermore, every finite lattice is isomorphic to a sublattice of the subgroup lattice of some finite group (Schmidt 1994, p. 9). Every finite distributive lattice is also isomorphic to the normal subgroup lattice of some group (Silcock 1977).

== Characteristic lattices ==
Subgroups with certain properties form lattices, but other properties do not.

- Normal subgroups always form a modular lattice. In fact, the essential property that guarantees that the lattice is modular is that subgroups commute with each other, i.e. that they are quasinormal subgroups.
- Nilpotent normal subgroups form a lattice, which is (part of) the content of Fitting's theorem.
- A class of groups is called a Fitting class if it is closed under isomorphism, subnormal subgroups, and products of subnormal subgroups. For any Fitting class F, both the subnormal F-subgroups and the normal F-subgroups form lattices. This generalizes the above with F the class of nilpotent groups, and another example is with F the class of solvable groups.
- Central subgroups form a lattice.

However, neither finite subgroups nor torsion subgroups form a lattice: for instance, the free product $\mathbf{Z}/2\mathbf{Z} * \mathbf{Z}/2\mathbf{Z}$ is generated by two torsion elements, but is infinite and contains elements of infinite order.

The fact that normal subgroups form a modular lattice is a particular case of a more general result, namely that in any Maltsev variety (of which groups are an example), the lattice of congruences is modular (Kearnes & Kiss 2013).

== Characterizing groups by their subgroup lattices ==
Lattice-theoretic information about the lattice of subgroups can sometimes be used to infer information about the original group, an idea that goes back to the work of Øystein Ore (1937, 1938). For instance, as Ore proved, a group is locally cyclic if and only if its lattice of subgroups is distributive. If additionally the lattice satisfies the ascending chain condition, then the group is cyclic.

Groups whose lattice of subgroups is a complemented lattice are called complemented groups (Zacher 1953), and groups whose lattice of subgroups are modular lattices are called Iwasawa groups or modular groups (Iwasawa 1941). Lattice-theoretic characterizations of this type also exist for solvable groups and perfect groups (Suzuki 1951).
