= Verbal subgroup =

A subgroup of a group

In mathematics, in the area of abstract algebra known as group theory, a verbal subgroup is a subgroup of a group that is generated by all elements that can be formed by substituting group elements for variables in a given set of words. For example, given the word $x^2$, the corresponding verbal subgroup is the group generated by all squares.

== Examples ==
For a given group $G$ the following are examples of verbal subgroups:

- The entire group $G$, given by the word $x$.
- The trivial subgroup, given by the empty word.
- The commutator subgroup, given by the word $[x,y]=xyx^{-1}y^{-1}$.
  - Furthermore every subgroup in the derived series is a verbal subgroup. The $n$th term of the derived series $G^{(n)}$ is given by the set of words $\{[w,v]\mid w,v\in F^{(n-1)}\}$ where $F$ is a free group with at least as many generators as $G$.
  - Every subgroup in the lower central series is a verbal subgroup. The $n$th term of the lower central series $G_{n}$ is given by the set of words $\{[w,x]\mid w\in F_{n-1}\}$ where $F$ is a free group with at least as many generators as $G$.

== Properties ==
- Verbal subgroups are fully characteristic subgroups. That is they are closed under endomorphisms of the ambient group. Since all fully characteristic subgroups are normal subgroups, verbal subgroups are normal.
- In free groups, the verbal subgroups are exactly the fully characteristic subgroups. Therefore verbal subgroups represent the generic example of fully characteristic subgroups.
- The lattice of verbal subgroups of the countably generated free group under inclusion is anti-isomomorphic to the lattice of group varieties under inclusion.

== Bibliography ==
- Magnus, Wilhelm; Karrass, Abraham; Solitar, Donald (2004), Combinatorial Group Theory, New York: Dover Publications, ISBN 978-0-486-43830-6, MR 0207802
- Neumann, B. H. (1967), Varieties of groups (PDF), pp. 603–613
