= Contranormal subgroup =

In mathematics, in the field of group theory, a contranormal subgroup is a subgroup whose normal closure in the group is the whole group. Clearly, a contranormal subgroup can be normal only if it is the whole group.

Some facts:

- Every subgroup of a finite group is a contranormal subgroup of a subnormal subgroup. In general, every subgroup of a group is a contranormal subgroup of a descendant subgroup.
- Every abnormal subgroup is contranormal.

== Bibliography ==
- Rose, John S. (1968), "Nilpotent Subgroups of Finite Soluble Groups", Math. Z., 106 (2): 97–112, doi:10.1007/BF01110717, S2CID 122382903
