= Correspondence theorem =

Theorem in group theory

In group theory, the correspondence theorem (also the lattice theorem, and variously and ambiguously the third and fourth isomorphism theorem) states that if $N$ is a normal subgroup of a group $G$, then there exists a bijection from the set of all subgroups $A$ of $G$ containing $N$, onto the set of all subgroups of the quotient group $G/N$. Loosely speaking, the structure of the subgroups of $G/N$ is exactly the same as the structure of the subgroups of $G$ containing $N$, with $N$ collapsed to the identity element.

Specifically, if

$G$ is a group,
$N \triangleleft G$, a normal subgroup of $G$,
$\mathcal{G} = \{ A \mid N \subseteq A \leq G \}$, the set of all subgroups $A$ of $G$ that contain $N$, and
$\mathcal{N} = \{ S \mid S \leq G/N \}$, the set of all subgroups of $G/N$,

then there is a bijective map $\phi: \mathcal{G} \to \mathcal{N}$ such that

$\phi(A) = A/N$ for all $A \in \mathcal{G}.$

One further has that if $A$ and $B$ are in $\mathcal{G}$ then

- $A \subseteq B$ if and only if $A/N \subseteq B/N$;
- if $A \subseteq B$ then $|B:A| = |B/N:A/N|$, where $|B:A|$ is the index of $A$ in $B$ (the number of cosets $bA$ of $A$ in $B$);
- $\langle A,B \rangle / N = \left\langle A/N, B/N \right\rangle,$ where $\langle A, B \rangle$ is the subgroup of $G$ generated by $A\cup B;$
- $(A \cap B)/N = A/N \cap B/N$, and
- $A$ is a normal subgroup of $G$ if and only if $A/N$ is a normal subgroup of $G/N$.

This list is far from exhaustive. In fact, most properties of subgroups are preserved in their images under the bijection onto subgroups of a quotient group.

More generally, there is a monotone Galois connection $(f^*, f_*)$ between the lattice of subgroups of $G$ (not necessarily containing $N$) and the lattice of subgroups of $G/N$: the lower adjoint of a subgroup $H$ of $G$ is given by $f^*(H) = HN/N$ and the upper adjoint of a subgroup $K/N$ of $G/N$ is a given by $f_*(K/N) = K$. The associated closure operator on subgroups of $G$ is $\bar H = HN$; the associated kernel operator on subgroups of $G/N$ is the identity. A proof of the correspondence theorem can be found here.

Similar results hold for rings, modules, vector spaces, and algebras. More generally an analogous result that concerns congruence relations instead of normal subgroups holds for any algebraic structure.

== See also ==
- Modular lattice
