= Retraction =

Retraction or retract(ed) may refer to:

== Academia ==
- Retraction in academic publishing, withdrawals of previously published academic journal articles

== Mathematics ==
- Retraction (category theory)
- Retract (group theory)
- Retraction (topology)

== Human physiology ==
- Retracted (phonetics), a sound pronounced to the back of the vocal tract, in linguistics
- Retracted tongue root, a position of the tongue during the pronunciation of a vowel, in phonetics
- Sternal retraction, a symptom of respiratory distress in humans
- Retraction (kinesiology), an anatomical term of motion
- Retractor (medicine), a surgical instrument used to separate the edges of a surgical incision/wound or to hold away certain organs and tissues

== Linguistics ==
- A process which has led to the Neo-Shtokavian accentuation, also known as "Neo-Shtokavian metatony"

== See also ==
- Retractor (disambiguation)
