= Weakly normal subgroup =

In mathematics, in the field of group theory, a subgroup $H$ of a group $G$ is said to be weakly normal if whenever $H^g \leq N_G(H)$, we have $g \in N_G(H)$.

Every pronormal subgroup is weakly normal.
