= Goursat's lemma =

Algebraic theorem

Goursat's lemma, named after the French mathematician Édouard Goursat, is an algebraic theorem about subgroups of the direct product of two groups.

It can be stated more generally in a Goursat variety (and consequently it also holds in any Maltsev variety), from which one recovers a more general version of Zassenhaus' butterfly lemma. In this form, Goursat's lemma also implies the snake lemma.

== Groups ==
Goursat's lemma for groups can be stated as follows.

Let $G$, $G'$ be groups, and let $H$ be a subgroup of $G\times G'$ such that the two projections $p_1: H \to G$ and $p_2: H \to G'$ are surjective (i.e., $H$ is a subdirect product of $G$ and $G'$). Let $N$ be the kernel of $p_2$ and $N'$ the kernel of $p_1$. One can identify $N$ as a normal subgroup of $G$, and $N'$ as a normal subgroup of $G'$. Then the image of $H$ in $G/N \times G'/N'$ is the graph of an isomorphism $G/N \cong G'/N'$. One then obtains a bijection between:
1. Subgroups of $G\times G'$ which project onto both factors,
2. Triples $(N, N', f)$ with $N$ normal in $G$, $N'$ normal in $G'$ and $f$ isomorphism of $G/N$ onto $G'/N'$.

An immediate consequence of this is that the subdirect product of two groups can be described as a fiber product and vice versa.

Notice that if $H$ is any subgroup of $G\times G'$ (the projections $p_1: H \to G$ and $p_2: H \to G'$ need not be surjective), then the projections from $H$ onto $p_1(H)$ and $p_2(H)$ are surjective. Then one can apply Goursat's lemma to $H \leq p_1(H)\times p_2(H)$.

To motivate the proof, consider the slice $S = \{g\} \times G'$ in $G \times G'$, for any arbitrary $g \in G$. By the surjectivity of the projection map to $G$, this has a non trivial intersection with $H$. Then essentially, this intersection represents exactly one particular coset of $N'$. Indeed, if we have elements $(g,a), (g,b) \in S \cap H$ with $a \in pN' \subset G'$ and $b \in qN' \subset G'$, then $H$ being a group, we get that $(e, ab^{-1}) \in H$, and hence, $(e, ab^{-1}) \in N'$. It follows that $(g,a)$ and $(g,b)$ lie in the same coset of $N'$. Thus the intersection of $H$ with every "horizontal" slice isomorphic to $G' \in G\times G'$ is exactly one particular coset of $N'$ in $G'$. By an identical argument, the intersection of $H$ with every "vertical" slice isomorphic to $G \in G\times G'$ is exactly one particular coset of $N$ in $G$.

All the cosets of $N,N'$ are present in the group $H$, and by the above argument, there is an exact 1:1 correspondence between them. The proof below further shows that the map is an isomorphism.

=== Proof ===
Before proceeding with the proof, $N$ and $N'$ are shown to be normal in $G \times \{e'\}$ and $\{e\} \times G'$, respectively. It is in this sense that $N$ and $N'$ can be identified as normal in G and G', respectively.

Since $p_2$ is a homomorphism, its kernel N is normal in H. Moreover, given $g \in G$, there exists $h=(g,g') \in H$, since $p_1$ is surjective. Therefore, $p_1(N)$ is normal in G, viz:

$$gp_1(N) = p_1(h)p_1(N) = p_1(hN) = p_1(Nh) = p_1(N)g$$.

It follows that $N$ is normal in $G \times \{e'\}$ since

$$(g,e')N = (g,e')(p_1(N) \times \{e'\}) = gp_1(N) \times \{e'\} = p_1(N)g \times \{e'\} = (p_1(N) \times \{e'\})(g,e') = N(g,e')$$.

The proof that $N'$ is normal in $\{e\} \times G'$ proceeds in a similar manner.

Given the identification of $G$ with $G \times \{e'\}$, we can write $G/N$ and $gN$ instead of $(G \times \{e'\})/N$ and $(g,e')N$, $g \in G$. Similarly, we can write $G'/N'$ and $g'N'$, $g' \in G'$.

On to the proof. Consider the map $H \to G/N \times G'/N'$ defined by $(g,g') \mapsto (gN, g'N')$. The image of $H$ under this map is $\{(gN,g'N') \mid (g,g') \in H \}$. Since $H \to G/N$ is surjective, this relation is the graph of a well-defined function $G/N \to G'/N'$ provided $g_1N = g_2N \implies g_1'N' = g_2'N'$ for every $(g_1,g_1'),(g_2,g_2') \in H$, essentially an application of the vertical line test.

Since $g_1N=g_2N$ (more properly, $(g_1,e')N = (g_2,e')N$), we have $(g_2^{-1}g_1,e') \in N \subset H$. Thus $(e,g_2'^{-1}g_1') = (g_2,g_2')^{-1}(g_1,g_1')(g_2^{-1}g_1,e')^{-1} \in H$, whence $(e,g_2'^{-1}g_1') \in N'$, that is, $g_1'N'=g_2'N'$.

Furthermore, for every $(g_1,g_1'),(g_2,g_2')\in H$ we have $(g_1g_2,g_1'g_2')\in H$. It follows that this function is a group homomorphism.

By symmetry, $\{(g'N',gN) \mid (g,g') \in H \}$ is the graph of a well-defined homomorphism $G'/N' \to G/N$. These two homomorphisms are clearly inverse to each other and thus are indeed isomorphisms.

== Goursat varieties ==
As a consequence of Goursat's theorem, one can derive a very general version on the Jordan–Hölder–Schreier theorem in Goursat varieties.
