= Absolutely simple group =

In mathematics, in the field of group theory, a group is said to be absolutely simple if it has no proper nontrivial serial subgroups. That is, $G$ is an absolutely simple group if the only serial subgroups of $G$ are $\{ e \}$ (the trivial subgroup), and $G$ itself (the whole group).

In the finite case, a group is absolutely simple if and only if it is simple. However, in the infinite case, absolutely simple is a stronger property than simple. The property of being strictly simple is somewhere in between.

== See also ==
- Ascendant subgroup
- Strictly simple group
