= Serial subgroup =

In the mathematical field of group theory, a subgroup H of a given group G is a serial subgroup of G if there is a chain C of subgroups of G extending from H to G such that for consecutive subgroups X and Y in C, X is a normal subgroup of Y. The relation is written H ser G or H is serial in G.

If the chain is finite between H and G, then H is a subnormal subgroup of G. Then every subnormal subgroup of G is serial. If the chain C is well-ordered and ascending, then H is an ascendant subgroup of G; if descending, then H is a descendant subgroup of G. If G is a locally finite group, then the set of all serial subgroups of G form a complete sublattice in the lattice of all normal subgroups of G.

== See also ==
- Characteristic subgroup
- Normal closure
- Normal core
