= Paranormal subgroup =

In mathematics, in the field of group theory, a paranormal subgroup is a subgroup such that the subgroup generated by it and any conjugate of it, is also generated by it and a conjugate of it within that subgroup.

In symbols, $H$ is paranormal in $G$ if given any $g$ in $G$, the subgroup $K$ generated by $H$ and $H^g$ is also equal to $H^K$. Equivalently, a subgroup is paranormal if its weak closure and normal closure coincide in all intermediate subgroups.

Here are some facts relating paranormality to other subgroup properties:

- Every pronormal subgroup, and hence, every normal subgroup and every abnormal subgroup, is paranormal.
- Every paranormal subgroup is a polynormal subgroup.
- In finite solvable groups, every polynormal subgroup is paranormal.
