= Iwasawa group =

In mathematics, a group is called an Iwasawa group, M-group or modular group if its lattice of subgroups is modular. Alternatively, a group G is called an Iwasawa group when every subgroup of G is permutable in G (Ballester-Bolinches, Esteban-Romero & Asaad 2010, pp. 24–25). The name is derived from Kenkichi Iwasawa.

Kenkichi Iwasawa (1941) proved that a p-group G is an Iwasawa group if and only if one of the following cases happens:

- G is a Dedekind group, or
- G contains an abelian normal subgroup N such that the quotient group G/N is a cyclic group and if q denotes a generator of G/N, then for all n ∈ N, q^{−1}nq = n^{1+p^{s}} where s ≥ 1 in general, but s ≥ 2 for p=2.

In Berkovich & Janko (2008, p. 257), Iwasawa's proof was deemed to have essential gaps, which were filled by Franco Napolitani and Zvonimir Janko. Roland Schmidt (1994) has provided an alternative proof along different lines in his textbook. As part of Schmidt's proof, he proves that a finite p-group is a modular group if and only if every subgroup is permutable, by (Schmidt 1994, Lemma 2.3.2, p. 55).

Every subgroup of a finite p-group is subnormal, and those finite groups in which subnormality and permutability coincide are called PT-groups. In other words, a finite p-group is an Iwasawa group if and only if it is a PT-group.

== Examples ==
The Iwasawa group of order 16 is isomorphic to the modular maximal-cyclic group of order 16.

== See also ==
- Modular law for groups
