= Seminormal =

Seminormal may refer to:

- Seminormal default theory, in non-classical logic
- Seminormal ring, in commutative algebra
- Seminormal subgroup, in group theory
