= Holomorph =

Holomorph may refer to:

Mathematics

- Holomorph (mathematics), a group which simultaneously contains (copies of) a group and its automorphism group
- Holomorphic functions, the central object of study of complex analysis

Biology

- Teleomorph, anamorph and holomorph, applying to portions of the life cycles of fungi in the phyla Ascomycota and Basidiomycota
