= Seminormal subgroup =

In mathematics, in the field of group theory, a subgroup $A$ of a group $G$ is termed seminormal if there is a subgroup $B$ such that $AB = G$, and for any proper subgroup $C$ of $B$, $AC$ is a proper subgroup of $G$.

This definition of seminormal subgroups is due to Xiang Ying Su.

Every normal subgroup is seminormal. For finite groups, every quasinormal subgroup is seminormal.
