= Abnormal subgroup =

In mathematics, specifically group theory, an abnormal subgroup is a subgroup H of a group G such that for all x in G, x lies in the subgroup generated by H and H^{x}, where H^{x} denotes the conjugate subgroup xHx^{−1}.

Here are some facts relating abnormality to other subgroup properties:

- Every abnormal subgroup is a self-normalizing subgroup, as well as a contranormal subgroup.
- The only normal subgroup that is also abnormal is the whole group.
- Every abnormal subgroup is a weakly abnormal subgroup, and every weakly abnormal subgroup is a self-normalizing subgroup.
- Every abnormal subgroup is a pronormal subgroup, and hence a weakly pronormal subgroup, a paranormal subgroup, and a polynormal subgroup.
