= Retract (group theory) =

Subgroup of a group in mathematics

In mathematics, in the field of group theory, a subgroup of a group is termed a retract if there is an endomorphism of the group that maps surjectively to the subgroup and is the identity on the subgroup. In symbols, $H$ is a retract of $G$ if and only if there is an endomorphism $\sigma: G \to G$ such that $\sigma(h) = h$ for all $h \in H$ and $\sigma(g) \in H$ for all $g \in G$.

The endomorphism $\sigma$ is an idempotent element in the transformation monoid of endomorphisms, so it is called an idempotent endomorphism or a retraction.

The following is known about retracts:

- A subgroup is a retract if and only if it has a normal complement. The normal complement, specifically, is the kernel of the retraction.
- Every direct factor is a retract. Conversely, any retract which is a normal subgroup is a direct factor.
- Every retract has the congruence extension property.
- Every regular factor, and in particular, every free factor, is a retract.

== See also ==
- Retraction (category theory)
- Retraction (topology)
