= Quasinormal subgroup =

In mathematics, in the field of group theory, a quasinormal subgroup, or permutable subgroup, is a subgroup of a group that commutes (permutes) with every other subgroup with respect to the product of subgroups. The term quasinormal subgroup was introduced by Øystein Ore in 1937.

Two subgroups are said to permute (or commute) if any element from the first subgroup, times an element of the second subgroup, can be written as an element of the second subgroup, times an element of the first subgroup. That is, $H$ and $K$ as subgroups of $G$ are said to commute if HK = KH, that is, any element of the form $hk$ with $h \in H$ and $k \in K$ can be written in the form $k'h'$ where $k' \in K$ and $h' \in H$.

Every normal subgroup is quasinormal, because a normal subgroup commutes with every element of the group. The converse is not true. For instance, any extension of a cyclic $p$-group by another cyclic $p$-group for the same (odd) prime has the property that all its subgroups are quasinormal. However, not all of its subgroups need be normal.

Every quasinormal subgroup is a modular subgroup, that is, a modular element in the lattice of subgroups. This follows from the modular property of groups. If all subgroups are quasinormal, then the group is called an Iwasawa group—sometimes also called a modular group, although this latter term has other meanings.

In any group, every quasinormal subgroup is ascendant.

A conjugate permutable subgroup is one that commutes with all its conjugate subgroups. Every quasinormal subgroup is conjugate permutable.

== In finite groups ==
Every quasinormal subgroup of a finite group is a subnormal subgroup. This follows from the somewhat stronger statement that every conjugate permutable subgroup is subnormal, which in turn follows from the statement that every maximal conjugate permutable subgroup is normal. (The finiteness is used crucially in the proofs.)

In summary, a subgroup H of a finite group G is permutable in G if and only if H is both modular and subnormal in G.

== PT-groups ==
Permutability is not a transitive relation in general. The groups in which permutability is transitive are called PT-groups, by analogy with T-groups in which normality is transitive.

== See also ==
- Central product
- Semipermutable subgroup
