= Locally cyclic =

Locally cyclic may refer to:

- Locally cyclic group
- Locally cyclic graph
