= Semipermutable subgroup =

In mathematics, in algebra, in the realm of group theory, a subgroup $H$ of a finite group $G$ is said to be semipermutable if $H$ commutes with every subgroup $K$ whose order is relatively prime to that of $H$.

Clearly, every permutable subgroup of a finite group is semipermutable. The converse, however, is not necessarily true.
