= Holomorph (mathematics) =

Semidirect product of a group with its automorphism group

In mathematics, the holomorph of a group $G$, denoted $\operatorname{Hol}(G)$, is a group that simultaneously contains $G$ and its automorphism group $\operatorname{Aut}(G)$. It provides interesting examples of groups, and allows one to treat group elements and group automorphisms in a uniform context. The holomorph can be described as a semidirect product or as a permutation group.

== Construction ==
=== As a semidirect product ===
If $\operatorname{Aut}(G)$ is the automorphism group of $G$, then

$$\operatorname{Hol}(G)=G\rtimes \operatorname{Aut}(G)$$,

where the multiplication is given by

$$(g,\alpha)(h,\beta)=(g\alpha(h),\alpha\beta).$$

Typically, a semidirect product is given in the form $G\rtimes_{\phi}A$, where $G$ and $A$ are groups and $\phi:A\rightarrow \operatorname{Aut}(G)$ is a homomorphism, and where the multiplication of elements in the semidirect product is given as

$$(g,a)(h,b)=(g\phi(a)(h),ab)$$.

This is well-defined since $\phi(a)\in \operatorname{Aut}(G)$, and therefore $\phi(a)(h)\in G$.

For the holomorph, $A=\operatorname{Aut}(G)$ and $\phi$ is the identity map. As such, we suppress writing $\phi$ explicitly in the multiplication.

As an example, take

- $G = C_3 = \langle x\rangle=\{1,x,x^2\}$, the cyclic group of order 3,
- $\operatorname{Aut}(G) = C_2 = \langle \sigma\rangle=\{1,\sigma\}$, where $\sigma(x)=x^2$, and
- $\operatorname{Hol}(G)=\{(x^i,\sigma^j)\}$ with the multiplication given by:

$$(x^{i_1},\sigma^{j_1})(x^{i_2},\sigma^{j_2}) = (x^{i_1+i_22^{^{j_1}}},\sigma^{j_1+j_2})$$,

where the exponents of $x$ are taken mod 3 and those of $\sigma$ mod 2.

Observe that

$$(x,\sigma)(x^2,\sigma)=(x^{1+2\cdot2},\sigma^2)=(x^2,1)$$,

while

$$(x^2,\sigma)(x,\sigma)=(x^{2+1\cdot2},\sigma^2)=(x,1)$$.

Hence, this group is not abelian, and so $\operatorname{Hol}(C_3)$ is a non-abelian group of order 6. The only such group is the symmetric group $S_3$.

=== As a permutation group ===
A group G acts naturally on itself by left and right multiplication, each giving rise to a homomorphism from G into the symmetric group on the underlying set of G. One homomorphism is defined as λ: G → Sym(G), λ_{g}(h) = g·h. That is, g is mapped to the permutation obtained by left-multiplying each element of G by g. Similarly, a second homomorphism ρ: G → Sym(G) is defined by ρ_{g}(h) = h·g^{−1}, where the inverse ensures that ρ_{gh}(k) = ρ_{g}(ρ_{h}(k)). These homomorphisms are called the left and right regular representations of G. Each homomorphism is injective, a fact referred to as Cayley's theorem.

For example, if G = C_{3} = {1, x, x^{2} } is a cyclic group of order three, then

- λ_{x}(1) = x·1 = x,
- λ_{x}(x) = x·x = x^{2}, and
- λ_{x}(x^{2}) = x·x^{2} = 1,

so λ(x) takes (1, x, x^{2}) to (x, x^{2}, 1).

The image of λ is a subgroup of Sym(G) isomorphic to G, and its normalizer in Sym(G) is defined to be the holomorph N of G. For each n in N and g in G, there is an h in G such that n·λ_{g} = λ_{h}·n. If an element n of the holomorph fixes the identity of G, then for 1 in G, (n·λ_{g})(1) = (λ_{h}·n)(1), but the left hand side is n(g), and the right side is h. In other words, if n in N fixes the identity of G, then for every g in G, n·λ_{g} = λ_{n(g)}·n. If g, h are elements of G, and n is an element of N fixing the identity of G, then applying this equality twice to n·λ_{g}·λ_{h} and once to the (equivalent) expression n·λ_{gg} gives that n(g)·n(h) = n(g·h). That is, every element of N that fixes the identity of G is in fact an automorphism of G. Such an n normalizes λ_{G}, and the only λ_{g} that fixes the identity is λ(1). Setting A to be the stabilizer of the identity, the subgroup generated by A and λ_{G} is semidirect product with normal subgroup λ_{G} and complement A. Since λ_{G} is transitive, the subgroup generated by λ_{G} and the point stabilizer A is all of N, which shows the holomorph as a permutation group is isomorphic to the holomorph as semidirect product.

It is useful, but not directly relevant, that the centralizer of λ_{G} in Sym(G) is ρ_{G}, their intersection is $\rho_{Z(G)}=\lambda_{Z(G)}$, where Z(G) is the center of G, and that A is a common complement to both of these normal subgroups of N.

== Properties ==
- ρ(G) ∩ Aut(G) = 1
- Aut(G) normalizes ρ(G) so that canonically ρ(G)Aut(G) ≅ G ⋊ Aut(G)
- $\operatorname{Inn}(G)\cong \operatorname{Im}(g\mapsto \lambda(g)\rho(g))$ since λ(g)ρ(g)(h) = ghg^{−1} ($\operatorname{Inn}(G)$ is the group of inner automorphisms of G.)
- K ≤ G is a characteristic subgroup if and only if λ(K) ⊴ Hol(G)
