= Fitting's theorem =

Fitting's theorem is a mathematical theorem proved by Hans Fitting. It can be stated as follows:

If M and N are nilpotent normal subgroups of a group G, then their product MN is also a nilpotent normal subgroup of G; if, moreover, M is nilpotent of class m and N is nilpotent of class n, then MN is nilpotent of class at most m + n.

By induction it follows also that the subgroup generated by a finite collection of nilpotent normal subgroups is nilpotent. This can be used to show that the Fitting subgroup of certain types of groups (including all finite groups) is nilpotent. However, a subgroup generated by an infinite collection of nilpotent normal subgroups need not be nilpotent.
