= Hans Fitting =

German mathematician

Hans Fitting (13 November 1906 in München-Gladbach (now Mönchengladbach) – 15 June 1938 in Königsberg (now Kaliningrad)) was a mathematician who worked in group theory. He proved Fitting's theorem and Fitting's lemma, and defined the Fitting subgroup in finite group theory and the Fitting decomposition for Lie algebras and Fitting ideals in ring theory.

After finishing his undergraduate work in 1931, he wrote his dissertation with the help of Emmy Noether, who helped him secure a grant from the Notgemeinschaft der Deutschen Wissenschaften (Emergency Society for German Sciences). He died at the age of 31 from a sudden bone disease.
