= Pronormal subgroup =

In mathematics, especially in the field of group theory, a pronormal subgroup is a subgroup that is embedded in a nice way. Pronormality is a simultaneous generalization of both normal subgroups and abnormal subgroups such as Sylow subgroups, (Doerk & Hawkes 1992, I.§6).

A subgroup is pronormal if each of its conjugates is conjugate to it already in the subgroup generated by it and its conjugate. That is, H is pronormal in G if for every g in G, there is some k in the subgroup generated by H and H^{g} such that H^{k} = H^{g}. (Here H^{g} denotes the conjugate subgroup gHg^{-1}.)

Here are some relations with other subgroup properties:

- Every normal subgroup is pronormal.
- Every Sylow subgroup is pronormal.
- Every pronormal subnormal subgroup is normal.
- Every abnormal subgroup is pronormal.
- Every pronormal subgroup is weakly pronormal, that is, it has the Frattini property.
- Every pronormal subgroup is paranormal, and hence polynormal.
