= Édouard Goursat =

French mathematician (1858–1936)

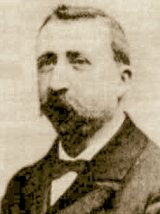
- Edouard Goursat
- Born: 21 May 1858; Lanzac, Lot
- Died: 25 November 1936 (aged 78); Paris
- Education: École Normale Supérieure
- Known for: Goursat tetrahedron Goursat theorem Goursat's lemma Inverse function theorem
- Scientific career
- Fields: Mathematics
- Workplaces: University of Paris
- Thesis: Sur l'équation différentielle linéaire qui admet pour intégrale la série hypergéométrique (1881)
- Doctoral advisor: Jean Gaston Darboux
- Doctoral students: Georges Darmois; Dumitru Ionescu

Édouard Jean-Baptiste Goursat (21 May 1858 – 25 November 1936) was a French mathematician, now remembered principally as an expositor for his Cours d'analyse mathématique, which appeared in the first decade of the twentieth century. It set a standard for the high-level teaching of mathematical analysis, especially complex analysis. This text was reviewed by William Fogg Osgood for the Bulletin of the American Mathematical Society. This led to its translation into English by Earle Raymond Hedrick published by Ginn and Company. Goursat also published texts on partial differential equations and hypergeometric series.

== Life ==
Edouard Goursat was born in Lanzac, Lot. He was a graduate of the École Normale Supérieure, where he later taught and developed his Cours. At that time the topological foundations of complex analysis were still not clarified, with the Jordan curve theorem considered a challenge to mathematical rigour (as it would remain until L. E. J. Brouwer took in hand the approach from combinatorial topology). Goursat's work was considered by his contemporaries, including G. H. Hardy, to be exemplary in facing up to the difficulties inherent in stating the fundamental Cauchy integral theorem properly. For that reason it is sometimes called the Cauchy–Goursat theorem.

== Work ==
Goursat, along with Möbius, Schläfli, Cayley, Riemann, Clifford and others, was one of the 19th century mathematicians who envisioned and explored a geometry of more than three dimensions.

He was the first to enumerate the finite groups generated by reflections in four-dimensional space, in 1889. The Goursat tetrahedra are the fundamental domains which generate, by repeated reflections of their faces, uniform polyhedra and their honeycombs which fill three-dimensional space. Goursat recognized that the honeycombs are four-dimensional Euclidean polytopes.

He derived a formula for the general displacement in four dimensions preserving the origin, which he recognized as a double rotation in two completely orthogonal planes.

Goursat was the first to note that the generalized Stokes theorem can be written in the simple form

$$\int_S \omega = \int_T d \omega$$

where $\omega$ is a p-form in n-space and S is the p-dimensional boundary of the (p + 1)-dimensional region T. Goursat also used differential forms to state the Poincaré lemma and its converse, namely, that if $\omega$ is a p-form, then $d\omega=0$ if and only if there is a (p − 1)-form $\eta$ with $d \eta=\omega$. However Goursat did not notice that the "only if" part of the result depends on the domain of $\omega$ and is not true in general. Élie Cartan himself in 1922 gave a counterexample, which provided one of the impulses in the next decade for the development of the De Rham cohomology of a differential manifold.

== Books by Edouard Goursat ==
- A Course In Mathematical Analysis Vol I Translated by O. Dunkel and E. R. Hedrick (Ginn and Company, 1904)
- A Course In Mathematical Analysis Vol II, part I Translated by O. Dunkel and E. R. Hedrick (Ginn and Company, 1916) (Complex analysis)
- A Course In Mathematical Analysis Vol II Part II Translated by O. Dunkel and E. R. Hedrick (Ginn and Company, 1917) (Differential Equations)
- Leçons sur l'intégration des équations aux dérivées partielles du premier ordre (Hermann, Paris, 1891)
- Leçons sur l'intégration des équations aux dérivées partielles du second ordre, à deux variables indépendantes Tome 1 (Hermann, Paris 1896–1898)
- Leçons sur l'intégration des équations aux dérivées partielles du second ordre, à deux variables indépendantes Tome 2 (Hermann, Paris 1896–1898)
- Leçons sur les séries hypergéométriques et sur quelques fonctions qui s'y rattachent (Hermann, Paris, 1936–1939)
- Le problème de Bäcklund (Gauthier-Villars, Paris, 1925)
- Leçons sur le problème de Pfaff (Hermann, Paris, 1922)
- Théorie des fonctions algébriques et de leurs intégrales : étude des fonctions analytiques sur une surface de Riemann with Paul Appell (Gauthier-Villars, Paris, 1895)
- Théorie des fonctions algébriques d'une variable et des transcendantes qui s'y rattachent Tome II, Fonctions automorphes with Paul Appell (Gauthier-Villars, 1930)

== See also ==
- Goursat structure
- Goursat's lemma
