= Locally cyclic group =

Group with every finitely generated subgroup as cyclic

In mathematics, a locally cyclic group is a group (G, *) in which every finitely generated subgroup is cyclic.

== Some facts ==
- Every cyclic group is locally cyclic, and every locally cyclic group is abelian.
- Every finitely-generated locally cyclic group is cyclic.
- Every subgroup and quotient group of a locally cyclic group is locally cyclic.
- Every homomorphic image of a locally cyclic group is locally cyclic.
- A group is locally cyclic if and only if every pair of elements in the group generates a cyclic group.
- A group is locally cyclic if and only if its lattice of subgroups is distributive (Ore 1938).
- The torsion-free rank of a locally cyclic group is 0 or 1.
- The endomorphism ring of a locally cyclic group is commutative.

== Examples of locally cyclic groups that are not cyclic ==
- The additive group of rational numbers (Q, +) is locally cyclic – any pair of rational numbers a/b and c/d is contained in the cyclic subgroup generated by 1/(bd).
- The additive group of the dyadic rational numbers, the rational numbers of the form a/2^{b}, is also locally cyclic – any pair of dyadic rational numbers a/2^{b} and c/2^{d} is contained in the cyclic subgroup generated by 1/2^{max(b,d)}.
- Let p be any prime, and let μ_{p^{∞}} denote the set of all pth-power roots of unity in C, i.e.
  $$\mu_{p^\infty} = \left\{\exp\left(\frac{2\pi im}{p^k}\right) : m, k \in \mathbb{Z}\right\}$$
  Then μ_{p^{∞}} is locally cyclic but not cyclic. This is the Prüfer p-group. The Prüfer 2-group is closely related to the dyadic rationals (it can be viewed as the dyadic rationals modulo 1).

== Examples of abelian groups that are not locally cyclic ==
- The additive group of real numbers (R, +); the subgroup generated by 1 and π (comprising all numbers of the form a + bπ) is isomorphic to the direct sum Z + Z, which is not cyclic.

== See also ==
- Bézout domain
