= Fitting ideal =

In commutative algebra, the Fitting ideals of a finitely generated module over a commutative ring describe the obstructions to generating the module by a given number of elements. They were introduced by Hans Fitting (1936).

== Definition ==
If M is a finitely generated module over a commutative ring R generated by elements m_{1},...,m_{n} with relations

$$a_{j1}m_1+\cdots + a_{jn}m_n=0\ (\text{for }j = 1, 2, \dots)$$

then the ith Fitting ideal $\operatorname{Fitt}_i(M)$ of M is generated by the minors (determinants of submatrices) of order $n-i$ of the matrix $a_{jk}$. The Fitting ideals do not depend on the choice of generators and relations of M.

Some authors defined the Fitting ideal $I(M)$ to be the first nonzero Fitting ideal $\operatorname{Fitt}_i(M)$.

== Properties ==
The Fitting ideals are increasing

$$\operatorname{Fitt}_0(M) \subseteq \operatorname{Fitt}_1(M) \subseteq \operatorname{Fitt}_2(M) \subseteq \cdots$$

If M can be generated by n elements then Fitt_{n}(M) = R, and if R is local the converse holds. We have Fitt_{0}(M) ⊆ Ann(M) (the annihilator of M), and Ann(M)Fitt_{i}(M) ⊆ Fitt_{i−1}(M), so in particular if M can be generated by n elements then Ann(M)^{n} ⊆ Fitt_{0}(M).

== Examples ==
If M is free of rank n then the Fitting ideals $\operatorname{Fitt}_i(M)$ are zero for i<n and R for i ≥ n.

If M is a finite abelian group of order $|M|$ (considered as a module over the integers) then the Fitting ideal $\operatorname{Fitt}_0(M)$ is the ideal $(|M|)$.

The Alexander polynomial of a knot is a generator of the Fitting ideal of the first homology of the infinite abelian cover of the knot complement.

== Fitting image ==
The zeroth Fitting ideal can be used also to give a variant of the notion of scheme-theoretic image of a morphism, a variant that behaves well in families. Specifically, given a finite morphism of noetherian schemes $f \colon X \rightarrow Y$, the $\mathcal{O}_Y$-module $f_* \mathcal{O}_X$ is coherent, so we may define $\operatorname{Fitt}_0(f_* \mathcal{O}_X)$ as a coherent sheaf of $\mathcal{O}_Y$-ideals; the corresponding closed subscheme of $Y$ is called the Fitting image of f.
