= Polynormal subgroup =

Subgroup group in group theory in mathematics

In mathematics, in the field of group theory, a subgroup of a group is said to be polynormal if its closure under conjugation by any element of the group can also be achieved via closure by conjugation by some element in the subgroup generated.

In symbols, a subgroup $H$ of a group $G$ is called polynormal if for any $g \in G$ the subgroup $K = H^{<g>}$ is the same as $H^{H^{<g>}}$.

Here are the relationships with other subgroup properties:

- Every weakly pronormal subgroup is polynormal.
- Every paranormal subgroup is polynormal.
