= Descendant subgroup =

Abstract algebra subgroup

In mathematics, in the field of group theory, a subgroup of a group is said to be descendant if there is a descending series starting from the subgroup and ending at the group, such that every term in the series is a normal subgroup of its predecessor.

The series may be infinite. If the series is finite, then the subgroup is subnormal.

== See also ==
- Ascendant subgroup
