= Retractor =

Retractor may refer to:

- Retractor (medical), a medical instrument
- Retractor (memory), a person
- Retractor (chess), type of a chess problem
- Retractor muscles in zoology
