= Characteristic subgroup =

Subgroup mapped to itself under every automorphism of the parent group

In group theory, a characteristic subgroup is a subgroup that is mapped to itself by every automorphism of the parent group. Because every conjugation map is an inner automorphism, every characteristic subgroup is normal; though the converse is not true. Examples of characteristic subgroups include the commutator subgroup and the center of a group.

== Definition ==
A subgroup $H$ of a group $G$ is called a characteristic subgroup if for every automorphism $\varphi$ of $G$, one has $\varphi(H)\leq H$; then write H char G.

This is equivalent to the stronger condition $\varphi(H) = H$ for every automorphism $\varphi$ of $G$, because $\varphi^{-1}(H)\leq H$ implies the reverse inclusion $H\leq \varphi(H)$.

== Basic properties ==
Given $H\,\mathrm{char}\,G$, every automorphism of $G$ induces an automorphism of the quotient group $G/H$, which yields a homomorphism $\operatorname{Aut}(G)\to\operatorname{Aut}(G/H)$.

If $G$ has a unique subgroup $H$ of a given index, then $H$ is characteristic in $G$.

== Related concepts ==
=== Normal subgroup ===
A subgroup $H$ of $G$ that is invariant under all inner automorphisms is called normal; sometimes called an invariant subgroup.

Since $\operatorname{Inn}(G)\subseteq\operatorname{Aut}(G)$ and a characteristic subgroup is invariant under all automorphisms, every characteristic subgroup is normal. However, not every normal subgroup is characteristic. Here are several examples:

- Let $H$ be a nontrivial group, and let $G=H\times H$ be the direct product. Then the subgroups $\{1\}\times H$ and $H\times \{1\}$ are both normal, but neither is characteristic. In particular, neither of these subgroups is invariant under the automorphism $(x,y)\mapsto (y,x)$, that switches the two factors.
  - For a concrete example of this, let $V\cong\mathbb{Z}_2 \times \mathbb{Z}_2$ be the Klein four-group. Since this group is abelian, every subgroup is normal; however, every permutation of the $3$ non-identity elements is an automorphism of $V$, so the $3$ subgroups of order $2$ are not characteristic. Formally, $V=\{e,a,b,ab\}$. If $H=\{e,a\}$ for example and $T$ is the automorphism switching $a$ and $b$, then $T(H)$ is not contained in $H$.
- In the quaternion group of order 8, each of the cyclic subgroups of order 4 is normal, but none of these are characteristic. However, the subgroup, $\{1,-1\}$, is characteristic, since it is the only subgroup of order 2.
- If $n>2$ is even, the dihedral group of order $2n$ has $3$ subgroups of index $2$, all of which are normal. One of these is the cyclic subgroup, which is characteristic. The other two subgroups are dihedral; these are permuted by an outer automorphism of the parent group, and are therefore not characteristic.

=== Strictly characteristic subgroup ===
A strictly characteristic subgroup, or a distinguished subgroup, is one which is invariant under surjective endomorphisms. For finite groups, surjectivity of an endomorphism implies injectivity, so a surjective endomorphism is an automorphism; thus, strictly characteristic is equivalent to characteristic. This is not the case for infinite groups.

=== Fully characteristic subgroup ===
For an even stronger constraint, a fully characteristic subgroup (also, fully invariant subgroup) of a group $G$, is a subgroup H ≤ G that is invariant under every endomorphism of $G$ (and not just every automorphism):

∀φ ∈ End(G)： φ(H) ≤ H.

Every group has itself (the improper subgroup) and the trivial subgroup as two of its fully characteristic subgroups. The commutator subgroup of a group is always a fully characteristic subgroup.

Every endomorphism of $G$ induces an endomorphism of $G/H$, which yields a map End(G) → End(G/H).

=== Verbal subgroup ===
An even stronger constraint is verbal subgroup, which is the image of a fully invariant subgroup of a free group under a homomorphism. More generally, any verbal subgroup is always fully characteristic. For any reduced free group, and, in particular, for any free group, the converse also holds: every fully characteristic subgroup is verbal.

== Transitivity ==
The property of being characteristic or fully characteristic is transitive; if $H$ is a (fully) characteristic subgroup of $K$, and $K$ is a (fully) characteristic subgroup of $G$, then $H$ is a (fully) characteristic subgroup of $G$.

H char K char G ⇒ H char G.

Moreover, while normality is not transitive, it is true that every characteristic subgroup of a normal subgroup is normal.

H char K ⊲ G ⇒ H ⊲ G

Similarly, while being strictly characteristic (distinguished) is not transitive, it is true that every fully characteristic subgroup of a strictly characteristic subgroup is strictly characteristic.

However, unlike normality, if H char G and $K$ is a subgroup of $G$ containing $H$, then in general $H$ is not necessarily characteristic in $K$.

H char G, H < K < G ⇏ H char K

== Containments ==
Every subgroup that is fully characteristic is certainly strictly characteristic and characteristic; but a characteristic or even strictly characteristic subgroup need not be fully characteristic.

The center of a group is always a strictly characteristic subgroup, but it is not always fully characteristic. For example, the finite group of order $12$, Sym(3) × $\Z/2 \Z$, has a homomorphism taking $(\pi,y)$ to $((1,2)^y,0)$, which takes the center, $1 \times \Z/2\Z$, into a subgroup of Sym(3) × 1, which meets the center only in the identity.

The relationship amongst these subgroup properties can be expressed as:

Normal ⇐ Characteristic ⇐ Strictly characteristic ⇐ Fully characteristic ⇐ Verbal

== Examples ==
=== Finite example ===
Consider the group $G = S_3 \times \mathbb{Z}_2$ (the group of order 12 that is the direct product of the symmetric group of order 6 and a cyclic group of order 2). The center of $G$ is isomorphic to its second factor $\mathbb{Z}_2$. Note that the first factor, $S_3$, contains subgroups isomorphic to $\mathbb{Z}_2$, for instance ${e, (12)}$; let $f: \mathbb{Z}_2 \rarr \text{S}_3$ be the morphism mapping $\mathbb{Z}_2$ onto the indicated subgroup. Then the composition of the projection of $G$ onto its second factor $\mathbb{Z}_2$, followed by $f$, followed by the inclusion of $S_3$ into $G$ as its first factor, provides an endomorphism of $G$ under which the image of the center, $\mathbb{Z}_2$, is not contained in the center, so here the center is not a fully characteristic subgroup of $G$.

=== Cyclic groups ===
Every subgroup of a cyclic group is characteristic.

=== Subgroup functors ===
The derived subgroup (or commutator subgroup) of a group is a verbal subgroup. The torsion subgroup of an abelian group is a fully invariant subgroup.

=== Topological groups ===
The identity component of a topological group is always a characteristic subgroup.

== See also ==
- Characteristically simple group
