= Subnormal subgroup =

In mathematics, in the field of group theory, a subgroup H of a given group G is a subnormal subgroup of G if there is a finite chain of subgroups of the group, each one normal in the next, beginning at H and ending at G.

In notation, $H$ is $k$-subnormal in $G$ if there are subgroups

$$H=H_0,H_1,H_2,\ldots, H_k=G$$

of $G$ such that $H_i$ is normal in $H_{i+1}$ for each $i$.

A subnormal subgroup is a subgroup that is $k$-subnormal for some positive integer $k$. Some facts about subnormal subgroups:

- A 1-subnormal subgroup is a proper normal subgroup (and vice versa).
- A finitely generated group is nilpotent if and only if each of its subgroups is subnormal.
- Every quasinormal subgroup, and, more generally, every conjugate-permutable subgroup, of a finite group is subnormal.
- Every pronormal subgroup that is also subnormal, is normal. In particular, a Sylow subgroup is subnormal if and only if it is normal.
- Every 2-subnormal subgroup is a conjugate-permutable subgroup.
- A subgroup $H$ is subnormal in $G$ if and only if $|HK|$ divides $|G|$ for every subgroup $K$ of $G$.

The property of subnormality is transitive, that is, a subnormal subgroup of a subnormal subgroup is subnormal. The relation of subnormality can be defined as the transitive closure of the relation of normality.

If every subnormal subgroup of G is normal in G, then G is called a T-group.

== See also ==
- Characteristic subgroup
- Normal core
- Normal closure
- Ascendant subgroup
- Descendant subgroup
- Serial subgroup
