= Ascendant subgroup =

Type of subgroup in group theory

In mathematics, in the field of group theory, a subgroup of a group is said to be ascendant if there is an ascending series starting from the subgroup and ending at the group, such that every term in the series is a normal subgroup of its successor.

The series may be infinite. If the series is finite, then the subgroup is subnormal. Here are some properties of ascendant subgroups:

- Every subnormal subgroup is ascendant; every ascendant subgroup is serial.
- In a finite group, the properties of being ascendant and subnormal are equivalent.
- An arbitrary intersection of ascendant subgroups is ascendant.
- Given any subgroup, there is a minimal ascendant subgroup containing it.

== See also ==
- Descendant subgroup
