= Direct product of groups =

Mathematical concept

In mathematics, specifically in group theory, the direct product is an operation that takes two groups G and H and constructs a new group, usually denoted G × H. This operation is the group-theoretic analogue of the Cartesian product of sets and is one of several important notions of direct product in mathematics.

In the context of abelian groups, the direct product is sometimes referred to as the direct sum, and is denoted $G \oplus H$. Direct sums play an important role in the classification of abelian groups: according to the fundamental theorem of finite abelian groups, every finite abelian group can be expressed as the direct sum of cyclic groups.

== Definition ==
Given groups G (with operation *) and H (with operation ∆), the direct product G × H is defined as follows:

1. The underlying set is the Cartesian product, G × H. That is, the ordered pairs (g, h), where g ∈ G and h ∈ H.
2. The binary operation on G × H is defined component-wise:
  (g_{1}, h_{1}) · (g_{2}, h_{2}) = (g_{1} * g_{2}, h_{1} ∆ h_{2})

The resulting algebraic object satisfies the axioms for a group. Specifically:

Associativity
The binary operation on G × H is associative.
Identity
The direct product has an identity element, namely (1_{G}, 1_{H}), where 1_{G} is the identity element of G and 1_{H} is the identity element of H.
Inverses
The inverse of an element (g, h) of G × H is the pair (g^{−1}, h^{−1}), where g^{−1} is the inverse of g in G, and h^{−1} is the inverse of h in H.

== Examples ==
- Let R be the group of real numbers under addition. Then the direct product R × R is the group of all two-component vectors (x, y) under the operation of vector addition:

(x_{1}, y_{1}) + (x_{2}, y_{2}) = (x_{1} + x_{2}, y_{1} + y_{2}).

- Let R^{+} be the group of positive real numbers under multiplication. Then the direct product R^{+} × R^{+} is the group of all vectors in the first quadrant under the operation of component-wise multiplication

(x_{1}, y_{1}) × (x_{2}, y_{2}) = (x_{1} × x_{2}, y_{1} × y_{2}).

- Let G and H be cyclic groups with two elements each:
- $G$
  *	1	a
  1	1	a
  a	a	1
- $H$
  *	1	b
  1	1	b
  b	b	1

Then the direct product G × H is isomorphic to the Klein four-group:

$G\times H$
*	(1,1)	(a,1)	(1,b)	(a,b)
(1,1)	(1,1)	(a,1)	(1,b)	(a,b)
(a,1)	(a,1)	(1,1)	(a,b)	(1,b)
(1,b)	(1,b)	(a,b)	(1,1)	(a,1)
(a,b)	(a,b)	(1,b)	(a,1)	(1,1)

== Elementary properties ==
- The direct product is commutative and associative up to isomorphism. That is, G × H ≅ H × G and (G × H) × K ≅ G × (H × K) for any groups G, H, and K.
- If G is any group and {1} is the trivial group, then G ≅ G × {1} ≅ {1} × G.
- The order of G × H is the product of the orders of G and H:
  |G × H| = |G| |H|.
  This follows from the formula for the cardinality of the cartesian product of sets.
- If g in G and h in H have finite order, then the order of (g, h) is the least common multiple of the orders of g and h. In particular, if g and h have finite order, and their orders are relatively prime, then the order of (g, h) is the product of the orders of g and h .
- As a consequence, if G and H are finite cyclic groups whose orders are relatively prime, then G × H is cyclic. For example, if m and n are relatively prime, then
  (Z/mZ) × (Z/nZ) ≅ Z/mnZ.
  This fact is closely related to the Chinese remainder theorem.

== Algebraic structure ==
Let G and H be groups, let P = G × H, and consider the following two subsets of P:

G′ = { (g, 1) : g ∈ G } and H′ = { (1, h) : h ∈ H }.

Both of these are in fact subgroups of P, the first being isomorphic to G, and the second being isomorphic to H. If we identify these with G and H, respectively, then we can think of the direct product P as containing the original groups G and H as subgroups.

These subgroups of P have the following three important properties: (Saying again that we identify G′ and H′ with G and H, respectively.)

1. The intersection G ∩ H is trivial.
2. Every element of P can be expressed uniquely as the product of an element of G and an element of H.
3. Every element of G commutes with every element of H.

Together, these three properties completely determine the algebraic structure of the direct product P. That is, if P is any group having subgroups G and H that satisfy the properties above, then P is necessarily isomorphic to the direct product of G and H. In this situation, P is sometimes referred to as the internal direct product of its subgroups G and H.

In some contexts, the third property above is replaced by the following:

3′. Both G and H are normal in P.

This property is equivalent to property 3, since the elements of two normal subgroups with trivial intersection necessarily commute, a fact which can be deduced by considering the commutator [g,h] of any g in G, h in H.

=== Examples ===
- Let V be the Klein four-group:
  V
  ∙	1	a	b	c
  1	1	a	b	c
  a	a	1	c	b
  b	b	c	1	a
  c	c	b	a	1
  Then V is the internal direct product of the two-element subgroups {1, a} and {1, b}.
- Let $\langle a \rangle$ be a cyclic group of order mn, where m and n are relatively prime. Then $\langle a^n \rangle$ and $\langle a^m \rangle$ are cyclic subgroups of orders m and n, respectively, and $\langle a \rangle$ is the internal direct product of these subgroups.
- Let C^{×} be the group of nonzero complex numbers under multiplication. Then C^{×} is the internal direct product of the circle group T of unit complex numbers and the group R^{+} of positive real numbers under multiplication.
- If n is odd, then the general linear group GL(n, R) is the internal direct product of the special linear group SL(n, R) and the subgroup consisting of all scalar matrices.
- Similarly, when n is odd the orthogonal group O(n, R) is the internal direct product of the special orthogonal group SO(n, R) and the two-element subgroup {−I, I}, where I denotes the identity matrix.
- The symmetry group of a cube is the internal direct product of the subgroup of rotations and the two-element group {−I, I}, where I is the identity element and −I is the point reflection through the center of the cube. A similar fact holds true for the symmetry group of an icosahedron.
- Let n be odd, and let D_{4n} be the dihedral group of order 4n:
  $$D_{4n} = \langle r, s \mid r^{2n} = s^2 = 1, sr = r^{-1}s \rangle.$$
  Then D_{4n} is the internal direct product of the subgroup $\langle r^2, s \rangle$ (which is isomorphic to D_{2n}) and the two-element subgroup {1, r^{n}}.

=== Presentations ===
The algebraic structure of G × H can be used to give a presentation for the direct product in terms of the presentations of G and H. Specifically, suppose that

$G = \langle S_G \mid R_G \rangle \ \$ and $\ \ H = \langle S_H \mid R_H \rangle,$

where $S_G$ and $S_H$ are (disjoint) generating sets and $R_G$ and $R_H$ are defining relations. Then

$$G \times H = \langle S_G \cup S_H \mid R_G \cup R_H \cup R_P \rangle$$

where $R_P$ is a set of relations specifying that each element of $S_G$ commutes with each element of $S_H$.

For example if

$G = \langle a \mid a^3=1 \rangle \ \$ and $\ \ H = \langle b \mid b^5=1 \rangle$

then

$$G \times H = \langle a, b \mid a^3 = 1, b^5 = 1, ab=ba \rangle.$$

=== Normal structure ===
As mentioned above, the subgroups G and H are normal in G × H. Specifically, define functions π_{G}: G × H → G and π_{H}: G × H → H by

π_{G}(g, h) = g and π_{H}(g, h) = h.

Then π_{G} and π_{H} are homomorphisms, known as projection homomorphisms, whose kernels are H and G, respectively.

It follows that G × H is an extension of G by H (or vice versa). In the case where G × H is a finite group, it follows that the composition factors of G × H are precisely the union of the composition factors of G and the composition factors of H.

== Further properties ==
=== Universal property ===
The direct product G × H can be characterized by the following universal property. Let π_{G}: G × H → G and π_{H}: G × H → H be the projection homomorphisms. Then for any group P and any homomorphisms ƒ_{G}: P → G and ƒ_{H}: P → H, there exists a unique homomorphism ƒ: P → G × H making the following diagram commute:

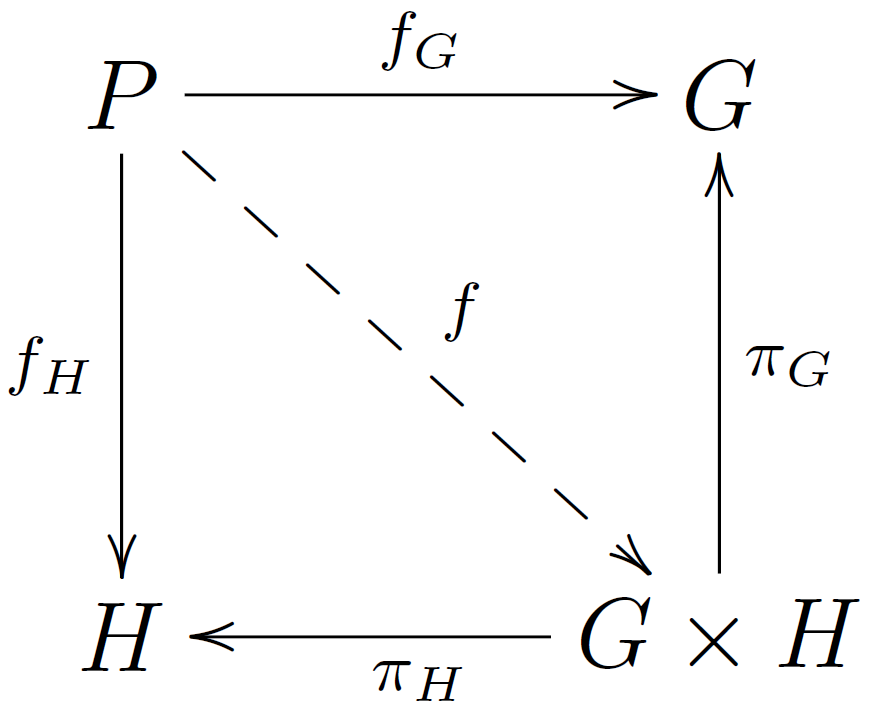

Specifically, the homomorphism ƒ is given by the formula

ƒ(p) = ( ƒ_{G}(p), ƒ_{H}(p) ).

This is a special case of the universal property for products in category theory.

=== Subgroups ===
If A is a subgroup of G and B is a subgroup of H, then A × B is a subgroup of G × H. For example, the isomorphic copy of G in G × H is the product G × {1} , where {1} is the trivial subgroup of H.

If A and B are normal, then A × B is a normal subgroup of G × H. Moreover, the quotient of the direct products is isomorphic to the direct product of the quotients:

(G × H) / (A × B) ≅ (G / A) × (H / B).

It is not true in general that every subgroup of G × H is the product of a subgroup of G with a subgroup of H. For example, if G is any non-trivial group, then the product G × G has a diagonal subgroup

Δ = { (g, g) : g ∈ G }

which is not the direct product of two subgroups of G.

The subgroups of a direct product of two groups are described by Goursat's lemma. Other subgroups include fiber products of G and H.

=== Conjugacy and centralizers ===
Two elements (g_{1}, h_{1}) and (g_{2}, h_{2}) are conjugate in G × H if and only if g_{1} and g_{2} are conjugate in G and h_{1} and h_{2} are conjugate in H. It follows that each conjugacy class in G × H is simply the Cartesian product of a conjugacy class in G and a conjugacy class in H.

Along the same lines, if (g, h) ∈ G × H, the centralizer of (g, h) is simply the product of the centralizers of g and h:

C_{G×H}(g, h) = C_{G}(g) × C_{H}(h).

Similarly, the center of G × H is the product of the centers of G and H:

Z(G × H) = Z(G) × Z(H).

Normalizers behave in a more complex manner since not all subgroups of direct products themselves decompose as direct products.

=== Automorphisms and endomorphisms ===
If α is an automorphism of G and β is an automorphism of H, then the product function α × β: G × H → G × H defined by

(α × β)(g, h) = (α(g), β(h))

is an automorphism of G × H. It follows that Aut(G × H) has a subgroup isomorphic to the direct product Aut(G) × Aut(H).

It is not true in general that every automorphism of G × H has the above form. (That is, Aut(G) × Aut(H) is often a proper subgroup of Aut(G × H).) For example, if G is any group, then there exists an automorphism σ of G × G that switches the two factors, i.e.

σ(g_{1}, g_{2}) = (g_{2}, g_{1}).

For another example, the automorphism group of Z × Z is GL(2, Z), the group of all 2 × 2 matrices with integer entries and determinant, ±1. This automorphism group is infinite, but only finitely many of the automorphisms have the form given above.

In general, every endomorphism of G × H can be written as a 2 × 2 matrix

$$\begin{bmatrix}\alpha & \beta \\ \gamma & \delta\end{bmatrix}$$

where α is an endomorphism of G, δ is an endomorphism of H, and β: H → G and γ: G → H are homomorphisms. Such a matrix must have the property that every element in the image of α commutes with every element in the image of β, and every element in the image of γ commutes with every element in the image of δ.

When G and H are indecomposable, centerless groups, then the automorphism group is relatively straightforward, being Aut(G) × Aut(H) if G and H are not isomorphic, and Aut(G) wr 2 if G ≅ H, wr denotes the wreath product. This is part of the Krull–Schmidt theorem, and holds more generally for finite direct products.

== Generalizations ==
=== Finite direct products ===
It is possible to take the direct product of more than two groups at once. Given a finite sequence G_{1}, ..., G_{n} of groups, the direct product

$$\prod_{i=1}^n G_i \;=\; G_1 \times G_2 \times \cdots \times G_n$$

is defined as follows:

- The elements of G_{1} × ⋯ × G_{n} are tuples (g_{1}, ..., g_{n}), where g_{i} ∈ G_{i} for each i.
- The operation on G_{1} × ⋯ × G_{n} is defined component-wise:
  (g_{1}, ..., g_{n})(g_{1}′, ..., g_{n}′) = (g_{1}g_{1}′, ..., g_{n}g_{n}′).

This has many of the same properties as the direct product of two groups, and can be characterized algebraically in a similar way.

=== Infinite direct products ===
It is also possible to take the direct product of an infinite number of groups. For an infinite sequence G_{1}, G_{2}, ... of groups, this can be defined just like the finite direct product of above, with elements of the infinite direct product being infinite tuples.

More generally, given an indexed family { G_{i} }_{i∈I} of groups, the direct product Π_{i∈I} G_{i} is defined as follows:

- The elements of Π_{i∈I} G_{i} are the elements of the infinite Cartesian product of the sets G_{i}; i.e., functions ƒ: I → ⋃_{i∈I} G_{i} with the property that ƒ(i) ∈ G_{i} for each i.
- The product of two elements ƒ, g is defined componentwise:
  (ƒ • g)(i) = ƒ(i) • g(i).

Unlike a finite direct product, the infinite direct product Π_{i∈I} G_{i} is not generated by the elements of the isomorphic subgroups { G_{i} }_{i∈I}. Instead, these subgroups generate a subgroup of the direct product known as the infinite direct sum, which consists of all elements that have only finitely many non-identity components.

=== Other products ===
==== Semidirect products ====
Recall that a group P with subgroups G and H is isomorphic to the direct product of G and H as long as it satisfies the following three conditions:

1. The intersection G ∩ H is trivial.
2. Every element of P can be expressed uniquely as the product of an element of G and an element of H.
3. Both G and H are normal in P.

A semidirect product of G and H is obtained by relaxing the third condition, so that only one of the two subgroups G, H is required to be normal. The resulting product still consists of ordered pairs (g, h), but with a slightly more complicated rule for multiplication.

It is also possible to relax the third condition entirely, requiring neither of the two subgroups to be normal. In this case, the group P is referred to as a Zappa–Szép product of G and H.

==== Free products ====
The free product of G and H, usually denoted G ∗ H, is similar to the direct product, except that the subgroups G and H of G ∗ H are not required to commute. That is, if

G = 〈 S_{G} | R_{G} 〉 and H = 〈 S_{H} | R_{H} 〉,

are presentations for G and H, then

G ∗ H = 〈 S_{G} ∪ S_{H} | R_{G} ∪ R_{H} 〉.

Unlike the direct product, elements of the free product cannot be represented by ordered pairs. In fact, the free product of any two nontrivial groups is infinite. The free product is actually the coproduct in the category of groups.

==== Subdirect products ====
If G and H are groups, a subdirect product of G and H is any subgroup of G × H which maps surjectively onto G and H under the projection homomorphisms. By Goursat's lemma, every subdirect product is a fiber product.

==== Fiber products ====
Let G, H, and Q be groups, and let 𝜑: G → Q and χ: H → Q be homomorphisms. The fiber product of G and H over Q, also known as a pullback, is the following subgroup of G × H:

$$G \times_{Q} H = \{ \, (g, h) \in G \times H : \varphi(g) = \chi(h) \,\}\text{.}$$
If 𝜑: G → Q and χ: H → Q are epimorphisms, then this is a subdirect product.
