= Normal subgroup =

Subgroup invariant under conjugation

In abstract algebra, a normal subgroup (also known as an invariant subgroup or self-conjugate subgroup) is a subgroup that is invariant under conjugation by members of the group of which it is a part. In other words, a subgroup $N$ of the group $G$ is normal in $G$ if and only if $gng^{-1} \in N$ for all $g \in G$ and $n \in N.$ The usual notation for this relation is $N \triangleleft G.$

Normal subgroups are important because they (and only they) can be used to construct quotient groups of the given group. Furthermore, the normal subgroups of $G$ are precisely the kernels of group homomorphisms with domain $G,$ which means that they can be used to internally classify those homomorphisms.

Évariste Galois was the first to realize the importance of the existence of normal subgroups.

== Definitions ==
A subgroup $N$ of a group $G$ is called a normal subgroup of $G$ if it is invariant under conjugation; that is, the conjugation of an element of $N$ by an element of $G$ is always in $N.$ The usual notation for this relation is $N \triangleleft G.$

=== Equivalent conditions ===
For any subgroup $N$ of $G,$ the following conditions are equivalent to $N$ being a normal subgroup of $G.$ Therefore, any one of them may be taken as the definition.

- The image of conjugation of $N$ by any element of $G$ is a subset of $N,$ i.e., $gNg^{-1}\subseteq N$ for all $g\in G$.
- The image of conjugation of $N$ by any element of $G$ is equal to $N,$ i.e., $gNg^{-1}= N$ for all $g\in G$.
- For all $g \in G,$ the left and right cosets $gN$ and $Ng$ are equal.
- The sets of left and right cosets of $N$ in $G$ coincide.
- Multiplication in $G$ preserves the equivalence relation "is in the same left coset as". That is, for every $g,g',h,h'\in G$ satisfying $g N = g' N$ and $h N = h' N$, we have $(g h) N = (g' h') N.$
- There exists a group on the set of left cosets of $N$ where multiplication of any two left cosets $gN$ and $hN$ yields the left coset $(gh)N$. (This group is called the quotient group of $G$ modulo $N$, denoted $G/N$.)
- $N$ is a union of conjugacy classes of $G.$
- $N$ is preserved by the inner automorphisms of $G.$
- There is some group homomorphism $G \to H$ whose kernel is $N.$
- There exists a group homomorphism $\phi:G \to H$ whose fibers form a group where the identity element is $N$ and multiplication of any two fibers $\phi^{-1}(h_1)$ and $\phi^{-1}(h_2)$ yields the fiber $\phi^{-1}(h_1 h_2)$. (This group is the same group $G/N$ mentioned above.)
- There is some congruence relation on $G$ for which the equivalence class of the identity element is $N$.
- For all $n\in N$ and $g\in G,$ the commutator $[n,g] = n^{-1} g^{-1} n g$ is in $N.$
- Any two elements commute modulo the normal subgroup membership relation. That is, for all $g, h \in G,$ $g h \in N$ if and only if $h g \in N.$

== Examples ==
For any group $G,$ the trivial subgroup $\{ e \}$ consisting of just the identity element of $G$ is always a normal subgroup of $G.$ Likewise, $G$ itself is always a normal subgroup of $G.$ (If these are the only normal subgroups, then $G$ is said to be simple.) Other named normal subgroups of an arbitrary group include the center of the group (the set of elements that commute with all other elements) and the commutator subgroup $[G,G].$ More generally, since conjugation is an isomorphism, any characteristic subgroup is a normal subgroup.

If $G$ is an abelian group then every subgroup $N$ of $G$ is normal, because $gN = \{gn\}_{n\in N} = \{ng\}_{n\in N} = Ng.$ More generally, for any group $G$, every subgroup of the center $Z(G)$ of $G$ is normal in $G$. (In the special case that $G$ is abelian, the center is all of $G$, hence the fact that all subgroups of an abelian group are normal.) A group that is not abelian but for which every subgroup is normal is called a Hamiltonian group.

A concrete example of a normal subgroup is the subgroup $N = \{(1), (123), (132)\}$ of the symmetric group $S_3,$ consisting of the identity and both three-cycles. In particular, one can check that every coset of $N$ is either equal to $N$ itself or is equal to $(12)N = \{ (12), (23), (13)\}.$ On the other hand, the subgroup $H = \{(1), (12)\}$ is not normal in $S_3$ since $(123)H = \{(123), (13) \} \neq \{(123), (23) \} = H(123).$ This illustrates the general fact that any subgroup $H \leq G$ of index two is normal.

As an example of a normal subgroup within a matrix group, consider the general linear group $\mathrm{GL}_n(\mathbf{R})$ of all invertible $n\times n$ matrices with real entries under the operation of matrix multiplication and its subgroup $\mathrm{SL}_n(\mathbf{R})$ of all $n\times n$ matrices of determinant 1 (the special linear group). To see why the subgroup $\mathrm{SL}_n(\mathbf{R})$ is normal in $\mathrm{GL}_n(\mathbf{R})$, consider any matrix $X$ in $\mathrm{SL}_n(\mathbf{R})$ and any invertible matrix $A$. Then using the two important identities $\det(AB)=\det(A)\det(B)$ and $\det(A^{-1})=\det(A)^{-1}$, one has that $\det(AXA^{-1}) = \det(A) \det(X) \det(A)^{-1} = \det(X) = 1$, and so $AXA^{-1} \in \mathrm{SL}_n(\mathbf{R})$ as well. This means $\mathrm{SL}_n(\mathbf{R})$ is closed under conjugation in $\mathrm{GL}_n(\mathbf{R})$, so it is a normal subgroup. (Note: In other language: $\det$ is a homomorphism from $\mathrm{GL}_n(\mathbf{R})$ to the multiplicative subgroup $\mathbf{R}^\times$, and $\mathrm{SL}_n(\mathbf{R})$ is the kernel. Both arguments also work over the complex numbers, or indeed over an arbitrary field.)

In the Rubik's Cube group, the subgroups consisting of operations which only affect the orientations of either the corner pieces or the edge pieces are normal.

The translation group is a normal subgroup of the Euclidean group in any dimension. This means: applying a rigid transformation, followed by a translation and then the inverse rigid transformation, has the same effect as a single translation. By contrast, the subgroup of all rotations about the origin is not a normal subgroup of the Euclidean group, as long as the dimension is at least 2: first translating, then rotating about the origin, and then translating back will typically not fix the origin and will therefore not have the same effect as a single rotation about the origin.

== Properties ==
- If $H$ is a normal subgroup of $G,$ and $K$ is a subgroup of $G$ containing $H,$ then $H$ is a normal subgroup of $K.$
- A normal subgroup of a normal subgroup of a group need not be normal in the group. That is, normality is not a transitive relation. The smallest group exhibiting this phenomenon is the dihedral group of order 8. However, a characteristic subgroup of a normal subgroup is normal. A group in which normality is transitive is called a T-group.
- The two groups $G$ and $H$ are normal subgroups of their direct product $G \times H.$
- If the group $G$ is a semidirect product $G = N \rtimes H,$ then $N$ is normal in $G,$ though $H$ need not be normal in $G.$
- If $M$ and $N$ are normal subgroups of an additive group $G$ such that $G = M + N$ and $M \cap N = \{0\}$, then $G = M \oplus N.$
- Normality is preserved under surjective homomorphisms; that is, if $G \to H$ is a surjective group homomorphism and $N$ is normal in $G,$ then the image $f(N)$ is normal in $H.$
- Normality is preserved by taking inverse images; that is, if $G \to H$ is a group homomorphism and $N$ is normal in $H,$ then the inverse image $f^{-1}(N)$ is normal in $G.$
- Normality is preserved on taking direct products; that is, if $N_1 \triangleleft G_1$ and $N_2 \triangleleft G_2,$ then $N_1 \times N_2\; \triangleleft \;G_1 \times G_2.$
- Every subgroup of index 2 is normal. More generally, a subgroup, $H,$ of finite index, $n,$ in $G$ contains a subgroup, $K,$ normal in $G$ and of index dividing $n!$ called the normal core. In particular, if $p$ is the smallest prime dividing the order of $G,$ then every subgroup of index $p$ is normal.
- The fact that normal subgroups of $G$ are precisely the kernels of group homomorphisms defined on $G$ accounts for some of the importance of normal subgroups; they are a way to internally classify all homomorphisms defined on a group. For example, a non-identity finite group is simple if and only if it is isomorphic to all of its non-identity homomorphic images, a finite group is perfect if and only if it has no normal subgroups of prime index, and a group is imperfect if and only if the derived subgroup is not supplemented by any proper normal subgroup.

=== Lattice of normal subgroups ===
Given two normal subgroups, $N$ and $M,$ of $G,$ their intersection $N\cap M$and their product $N M = \{n m : n \in N\; \text{ and }\; m \in M \}$ are also normal subgroups of $G.$

The normal subgroups of $G$ form a lattice under subset inclusion with least element, $\{ e \},$ and greatest element, $G.$ The meet of two normal subgroups, $N$ and $M,$ in this lattice is their intersection and the join is their product.

The lattice is complete and modular.

== Normal subgroups, quotient groups and homomorphisms ==
If $N$ is a normal subgroup, we can define a multiplication on cosets as follows:
$$\left(a_1 N\right) \left(a_2 N\right) := \left(a_1 a_2\right) N.$$
This relation defines a mapping $G/N\times G/N \to G/N.$ To show that this mapping is well-defined, one needs to prove that the choice of representative elements $a_1, a_2$ does not affect the result. To this end, consider some other representative elements $a_1'\in a_1 N, a_2' \in a_2 N.$ Then there are $n_1, n_2\in N$ such that $a_1' = a_1 n_1, a_2' = a_2 n_2.$ It follows that
$$a_1' a_2' N = a_1 n_1 a_2 n_2 N =a_1 a_2 n_1' n_2 N=a_1 a_2 N,$$
where we also used the fact that $N$ is a normal subgroup, and therefore there is $n_1'\in N$ such that $n_1 a_2 = a_2 n_1'.$ This proves that this product is a well-defined mapping between cosets.

With this operation, the set of cosets is itself a group, called the quotient group and denoted with $G/N.$ There is a natural homomorphism, $f : G \to G/N,$ given by $f(a) = a N.$ This homomorphism maps $N$ into the identity element of $G/N,$ which is the coset $e N = N,$ that is, $\ker(f) = N.$

In general, a group homomorphism, $f : G \to H$ sends subgroups of $G$ to subgroups of $H.$ Also, the preimage of any subgroup of $H$ is a subgroup of $G.$ We call the preimage of the trivial group $\{ e \}$ in $H$ the kernel of the homomorphism and denote it by $\ker f.$ As it turns out, the kernel is always normal and the image of $G, f(G),$ is always isomorphic to $G / \ker f$ (the first isomorphism theorem). In fact, this correspondence is a bijection between the set of all quotient groups of $G, G / N,$ and the set of all homomorphic images of $G$ (up to isomorphism). It is also easy to see that the kernel of the quotient map, $f : G \to G/N,$ is $N$ itself, so the normal subgroups are precisely the kernels of homomorphisms with domain $G.$

== See also ==
=== Operations taking subgroups to subgroups ===
- Normalizer
- Normal closure
- Normal core

=== Subgroup properties complementary (or opposite) to normality ===
- Malnormal subgroup
- Contranormal subgroup
- Abnormal subgroup
- Self-normalizing subgroup

=== Subgroup properties stronger than normality ===
- Characteristic subgroup
- Fully characteristic subgroup

=== Subgroup properties weaker than normality ===
- Subnormal subgroup
- Ascendant subgroup
- Descendant subgroup
- Quasinormal subgroup
- Seminormal subgroup
- Conjugate permutable subgroup
- Modular subgroup
- Pronormal subgroup
- Paranormal subgroup
- Polynormal subgroup
- C-normal subgroup

=== Related notions in algebra ===
- Ideal (ring theory)
- Semigroup ideal

== Bibliography ==
- Bergvall, Olof; Hynning, Elin; Hedberg, Mikael; Mickelin, Joel; Masawe, Patrick (16 May 2010). "On Rubik's Cube" (PDF). KTH.
- Cantrell, C.D. (2000). Modern Mathematical Methods for Physicists and Engineers. Cambridge University Press. ISBN 978-0-521-59180-5.
- Dõmõsi, Pál; Nehaniv, Chrystopher L. (2004). Algebraic Theory of Automata Networks. SIAM Monographs on Discrete Mathematics and Applications. SIAM.
- Dummit, David S.; Foote, Richard M. (2004). Abstract Algebra (3rd ed.). John Wiley & Sons. ISBN 0-471-43334-9.
- Fraleigh, John B. (2003). A First Course in Abstract Algebra (7th ed.). Addison-Wesley. ISBN 978-0-321-15608-2.
- Hall, Marshall (1999). The Theory of Groups. Providence: Chelsea Publishing. ISBN 978-0-8218-1967-8.
- Hungerford, Thomas (2003). Algebra. Graduate Texts in Mathematics. Springer.
- Hungerford, Thomas (2013). Abstract Algebra: An Introduction. Brooks/Cole Cengage Learning.
- Judson, Thomas W. (2020). Abstract Algebra: Theory and Applications.
- Robinson, Derek J. S. (1996). A Course in the Theory of Groups. Graduate Texts in Mathematics. Vol. 80 (2nd ed.). Springer-Verlag. ISBN 978-1-4612-6443-9. Zbl 0836.20001.
- Thurston, William (1997). Levy, Silvio (ed.). Three-dimensional geometry and topology, Vol. 1. Princeton Mathematical Series. Princeton University Press. ISBN 978-0-691-08304-9.
- Bradley, C. J. (2010). The mathematical theory of symmetry in solids : representation theory for point groups and space groups. Oxford New York: Clarendon Press. ISBN 978-0-19-958258-7. OCLC 859155300.
