= Subgroup =

Subset of a group that forms a group itself

In group theory, a branch of mathematics, a subset of a group G is a subgroup of G if the members of that subset form a group with respect to the group operation in G.

Formally, given a group G under a binary operation ∗, a subset H of G is called a subgroup of G if H also forms a group under the operation ∗. More precisely, H is a subgroup of G if the restriction of ∗ to H × H is a group operation on H. This is often denoted H ≤ G, read as "H is a subgroup of G".

The trivial subgroup of any group is the subgroup {e} consisting of just the identity element.

A proper subgroup of a group G is a subgroup H which is a proper subset of G (that is, H ≠ G). This is often represented notationally by H < G, read as "H is a proper subgroup of G". Some authors also exclude the trivial group from being proper (that is, H ≠ {e}).

If H is a subgroup of G, then G is sometimes called an overgroup of H.

The same definitions apply more generally when G is an arbitrary semigroup, but this article will only deal with subgroups of groups.

== Subgroup tests ==
Suppose that G is a group, and H is a subset of G. For now, assume that the group operation of G is written multiplicatively, denoted by juxtaposition.

- Then H is a subgroup of G if and only if H is nonempty and closed under products and inverses. Closed under products means that for every a and b in H, the product ab is in H. Closed under inverses means that for every a in H, the inverse a^{−1} is in H. These two conditions can be combined into one, that for every a and b in H, the element ab^{−1} is in H, but it is more natural and usually just as easy to test the two closure conditions separately.
- When H is finite, the test can be simplified: H is a subgroup if and only if it is nonempty and closed under products. These conditions alone imply that every element a of H generates a finite cyclic subgroup of H, say of order n, and then the inverse of a is a^{n−1}.

If the group operation is instead denoted by addition, then closed under products should be replaced by closed under addition, which is the condition that for every a and b in H, the sum a + b is in H, and closed under inverses should be edited to say that for every a in H, the inverse −a is in H.

== Basic properties of subgroups ==
- The identity of a subgroup is the identity of the group: if G is a group with identity e_{G}, and H is a subgroup of G with identity e_{H}, then e_{H} = e_{G}.
- The inverse of an element in a subgroup is the inverse of the element in the group: if H is a subgroup of a group G, and a and b are elements of H such that ab = ba = e_{H}, then ab = ba = e_{G}.
- If H is a subgroup of G, then the inclusion map H → G sending each element a of H to itself is a homomorphism.
- The intersection of subgroups A and B of G is again a subgroup of G. For example, the intersection of the x-axis and y-axis in $\R^2$ under addition is the trivial subgroup. More generally, the intersection of an arbitrary collection of subgroups of G is a subgroup of G.
- The union of subgroups A and B is a subgroup if and only if A ⊆ B or B ⊆ A. A non-example: $2\Z \cup 3\Z$ is not a subgroup of $\Z,$ because 2 and 3 are elements of this subset whose sum, 5, is not in the subset. Similarly, the union of the x-axis and the y-axis in $\R^2$ is not a subgroup of $\R^2.$
- If S is a subset of G, then there exists a smallest subgroup containing S, namely the intersection of all of subgroups containing S; it is denoted by ⟨S⟩ and is called the subgroup generated by S. An element of G is in ⟨S⟩ if and only if it is a finite product of elements of S and their inverses, possibly repeated.
- Every element a of a group G generates a cyclic subgroup ⟨a⟩. If ⟨a⟩ is isomorphic to $\Z/n\Z$ (the integers mod n) for some positive integer n, then n is the smallest positive integer for which a^{n} = e, and n is called the order of a. If ⟨a⟩ is isomorphic to $\Z,$ then a is said to have infinite order.
- The subgroups of any given group form a complete lattice under inclusion, called the lattice of subgroups. (While the infimum here is the usual set-theoretic intersection, the supremum of a set of subgroups is the subgroup generated by the set-theoretic union of the subgroups, not the set-theoretic union itself.) If e is the identity of G, then the trivial group {e} is the minimum subgroup of G, while the maximum subgroup is the group G itself.

G is the group $\Z/8\Z,$ the integers mod 8 under addition. The subgroup H contains only 0 and 4, and is isomorphic to $\Z/2\Z.$ There are four left cosets of H: H itself, 1 + H, 2 + H, and 3 + H (written using additive notation since this is an additive group). Together they partition the entire group G into equal-size, non-overlapping sets. The index [G : H] is 4.

== Cosets and Lagrange's theorem ==
Given a subgroup H and some a in G, we define the left coset aH = {ah : h in H}. Because a is invertible, the map φ : H → aH given by φ(h) = ah is a bijection. Furthermore, every element of G is contained in precisely one left coset of H; the left cosets are the equivalence classes corresponding to the equivalence relation a_{1} ~ a_{2} if and only if $a_1^{-1}a_2$ is in H. The number of left cosets of H is called the index of H in G and is denoted by [G : H].

Lagrange's theorem states that for a finite group G and a subgroup H,

$$[ G : H ] = { |G| \over |H| }$$

where |G| and |H| denote the orders of G and H, respectively. In particular, the order of every subgroup of G (and the order of every element of G) must be a divisor of |G|.

Right cosets are defined analogously: Ha = {ha : h in H}. They are also the equivalence classes for a suitable equivalence relation and their number is equal to [G : H].

If aH = Ha for every a in G, then H is said to be a normal subgroup. Every subgroup of index 2 is normal: the left cosets, and also the right cosets, are simply the subgroup and its complement. More generally, if p is the lowest prime dividing the order of a finite group G, then any subgroup of index p (if such exists) is normal.

== Example: Subgroups of Z_{8} ==
Let G be the finite cyclic group

$$\mathrm{Z}_8 = \{0,1,2,3,4,5,6,7\}$$

under addition modulo 8. The subset $\{0,2,4,6\}$ consisting of multiples of 2 is a subgroup of $\mathrm{Z}_8$. More generally, for each divisor d of 8, the multiples of d form a subgroup. Explicitly, for $d=1,2,4,8$, these subgroups are $\{0,1,2,3,4,5,6,7\}, \{0,2,4,6\}, \{0,4\}, \{0\}$.

In general, for any positive integer n, one can describe all subgroups of the finite cyclic group $\mathrm{Z}_n$ similarly: for each divisor d of n, the multiples of d in $\mathrm{Z}_n$ form a subgroup of order $n/d$, and every subgroup arises in this way.

Subgroups of cyclic groups are cyclic.

== Example: Subgroups of S_{4} ==
All 30 subgroups

Simplified

Hasse diagrams of the lattice of subgroups of S_{4}

The symmetric group S_{4} is the group whose elements are the permutations of $\{1,2,3,4\}$.
Below are all its subgroups, ordered by cardinality.

=== 24 elements ===
Like each group, S_{4} is a subgroup of itself.

=== 12 elements ===
The alternating group A_{4} consists of all the even permutations in S_{4}. Since it is of index 2, it is a normal subgroup.

=== 8 elements ===
There are three subgroups of order 8, each isomorphic to the dihedral group D_{4}, the group of symmetries of a square.

Labeling the vertices of a square $1,2,3,4$ counterclockwise lets one view D_{4} as a subgroup of S_{4}. This subgroup is generated by the 90-degree counterclockwise rotation and by the reflection in the diagonal axis joining vertices 2 and 4; these are the permutations $(1234)$ and $(13)$; see Dihedral group § Permutation representation.

Up to symmetries of the square, there are three different ways to label the vertices of a square, distinguished by which pairs of numbers appear on opposite corners. In the labeling above, 1 and 3 were opposite, and 2 and 4 were opposite; another choice has 1 and 4 opposite, and 2 and 3 opposite; the third choice has 1 and 2 opposite, and 3 and 4 opposite. The three labelings give rise to three different subgroups of order 8 in S_{4}, conjugate to each other, each isomorphic to D_{4}.

=== 6 elements ===
There are four subgroups of order 6, each isomorphic to S_{3}. Each is the stabilizer of one of the elements of $\{1,2,3,4\}$. For example, the stabilizer of 4 is the group of permutations in S_{4} that map 4 to 4, while permuting $\{1,2,3\}$ in an arbitrary way; it is generated by the permutations $(12)$ and $(123)$, for instance. The four subgroups of order 6 are conjugate to each other.

=== 4 elements ===
There are seven subgroups of order 4, falling into three conjugacy classes of subgroups:

- The subset $\{1,(12)(34),(13)(24),(14)(23)\}$ is a normal subgroup isomorphic to the Klein four-group V_{4}.
- The group generated by $(12)$ and $(34)$ is another subgroup isomorphic to V_{4}, but it is not normal. Instead it has conjugates, namely the group generated by $(13)$ and $(24)$ and the group generated by $(14)$ and $(23)$.
- Each of the six 4-cycles in S_{4} generates a cyclic subgroup of order 4, but each 4-cycle generates the same subgroup as its inverse, so there are only three distinct subgroups of this type. These three subgroups are conjugate to each other because all 4-cycles in S_{4} are conjugate to each other.

=== 3 elements ===
There are four subgroups of order 3, each generated by a 3-cycle. There are eight 3-cycles in S_{4}, but each generates the same subgroup as its inverse. The resulting four subgroups are conjugate to each other.

=== 2 elements ===
There are nine subgroups of order 2, falling into two conjugacy classes of subgroups:

- Each of the $\binom{4}{2} = 6$ transpositions (2-cycles) generates a subgroup of order 2. These six subgroups are conjugate.
- Each of the double-transpositions $(12)(34)$, $(13)(24)$, $(14)(23)$ generates a subgroup of order 2. These three subgroups are conjugate.

=== 1 element ===
The trivial subgroup is the unique subgroup of order 1.

== Other examples ==
- The even integers form a subgroup $2\Z$ of the integer ring $\Z:$ the sum of two even integers is even, and the negative of an even integer is even.
- Every ideal in a ring R is a subgroup of the additive group of R.
- Every linear subspace of a vector space is a subgroup of the additive group of vectors.
- In an abelian group, the elements of finite order form a subgroup called the torsion subgroup.
