= Grushko theorem =

Theorem in group theory

In the mathematical subject of group theory, the Grushko theorem or the Grushko–Neumann theorem is a theorem stating that the rank (that is, the smallest cardinality of a generating set) of a free product of two groups is equal to the sum of the ranks of the two free factors. The theorem was first obtained in a 1940 article of Grushko and then, independently, in a 1943 article of Neumann.

== Statement of the theorem ==
Let A and B be finitely generated groups and let A∗B be the free product of A and B. Then

rank(A∗B) = rank(A) + rank(B).

It is obvious that rank(A∗B) ≤ rank(A) + rank(B) since if X is a finite generating set of A and Y is a finite generating set of B then X∪Y is a generating set for A∗B and that |X ∪ Y| ≤ |X| + |Y|. The opposite inequality, rank(A∗B) ≥ rank(A) + rank(B), requires proof.

Grushko, but not Neumann, proved a more precise version of Grushko's theorem in terms of Nielsen equivalence. It states that if M = (g_{1}, g_{2}, ..., g_{n}) is an n-tuple of elements of G = A∗B such that M generates G, <g_{1}, g_{2}, ..., g_{n}> = G, then M is Nielsen equivalent in G to an n-tuple of the form

M' = (a_{1}, ..., a_{k}, b_{1}, ..., b_{n−k}) where {a_{1}, ..., a_{k}}⊆A is a generating set for A and where {b_{1}, ..., b_{n−k}}⊆B is a generating set for B. In particular, rank(A) ≤ k, rank(B) ≤ n − k and rank(A) + rank(B) ≤ k + (n − k) = n. If one takes M to be the minimal generating tuple for G, that is, with n = rank(G), this implies that rank(A) + rank(B) ≤ rank(G). Since the opposite inequality, rank(G) ≤ rank(A) + rank(B), is obvious, it follows that rank(G)=rank(A) + rank(B), as required.

== History and generalizations ==
After the original proofs of Grushko (1940) and Neumann(1943), there were many subsequent alternative proofs, simplifications and generalizations of Grushko's theorem. A close version of Grushko's original proof is given in the 1955 book of Kurosh.

Like the original proofs, Lyndon's proof (1965) relied on length-functions considerations but with substantial simplifications. A 1965 paper of Stallings gave a greatly simplified topological proof of Grushko's theorem.

A 1970 paper of Zieschang gave a Nielsen equivalence version of Grushko's theorem (stated above) and provided some generalizations of Grushko's theorem for amalgamated free products. Scott (1974) gave another topological proof of Grushko's theorem, inspired by the methods of 3-manifold topology Imrich (1984) gave a version of Grushko's theorem for free products with infinitely many factors.

A 1976 paper of Chiswell gave a relatively straightforward proof of Grushko's theorem, modelled on Stallings' 1965 proof, that used the techniques of Bass–Serre theory. The argument directly inspired the machinery of foldings for group actions on trees and for graphs of groups and Dicks' even more straightforward proof of Grushko's theorem (see, for example,).

Grushko's theorem is, in a sense, a starting point in Dunwoody's theory of accessibility for finitely generated and finitely presented groups. Since the ranks of the free factors are smaller than the rank of a free product, Grushko's theorem implies that the process of iterated splitting of a finitely generated group G as a free product must terminate in a finite number of steps (more precisely, in at most rank(G) steps). There is a natural similar question for iterating splittings of finitely generated groups over finite subgroups. Dunwoody proved that such a process must always terminate if a group G is finitely presented but may go on forever if G is finitely generated but not finitely presented.

An algebraic proof of a substantial generalization of Grushko's theorem using the machinery of groupoids was given by Higgins (1966). Higgins' theorem starts with groups G and B with free decompositions G = ∗_{i} G_{i}, B = ∗_{i} B_{i} and f : G → B a morphism such that f(G_{i}) = B_{i} for all i. Let H be a subgroup of G such that f(H) = B. Then H has a decomposition H = ∗_{i} H_{i} such that f(H_{i}) = B_{i} for all i. Full details of the proof and applications may also be found in .

== Grushko decomposition theorem ==
A useful consequence of the original Grushko theorem is the so-called Grushko decomposition theorem. It asserts that any nontrivial finitely generated group G can be decomposed as a free product

G = A_{1}∗A_{2}∗...∗A_{r}∗F_{s}, where s ≥ 0, r ≥ 0,

where each of the groups A_{i} is nontrivial, freely indecomposable (that is, it cannot be decomposed as a free product) and not infinite cyclic, and where F_{s} is a free group of rank s; moreover, for a given G, the groups A_{1}, ..., A_{r} are unique up to a permutation of their conjugacy classes in G (and, in particular, the sequence of isomorphism types of these groups is unique up to a permutation) and the numbers s and r are unique as well.

More precisely, if G = B_{1}∗...∗B_{k}∗F_{t} is another such decomposition then k = r, s = t, and there exists a permutation σ∈S_{r} such that for each i=1,...,r the subgroups A_{i} and B_{σ(i)} are conjugate in G.

The existence of the above decomposition, called the Grushko decomposition of G, is an immediate corollary of the original Grushko theorem, while the uniqueness statement requires additional arguments (see, for example).

Algorithmically computing the Grushko decomposition for specific classes of groups is a difficult problem which primarily requires being able to determine if a given group is freely decomposable. Positive results are available for some classes of groups such as torsion-free word-hyperbolic groups, certain classes of relatively hyperbolic groups, fundamental groups of finite graphs of finitely generated free groups and others.

Grushko decomposition theorem is a group-theoretic analog of the Kneser prime decomposition theorem for 3-manifolds which says that a closed 3-manifold can be uniquely decomposed as a connected sum of irreducible 3-manifolds.

== Sketch of the proof using Bass–Serre theory ==
The following is a sketch of the proof of Grushko's theorem based on the use of foldings techniques for groups acting on trees (see for complete proofs using this argument).

Let S={g_{1},....,g_{n}} be a finite generating set for G=A∗B of size |S|=n=rank(G). Realize G as the fundamental group of a graph of groups Y which is a single non-loop edge with vertex groups A and B and with the trivial edge group. Let $\tilde{\mathbf Y}$ be the Bass–Serre covering tree for Y. Let F=F(x_{1},....,x_{n}) be the free group with free basis x_{1},....,x_{n} and let φ_{0}:F → G be the homomorphism such that φ_{0}(x_{i})=g_{i} for i=1,...,n. Realize F as the fundamental group of a graph Z_{0} which is the wedge of n circles that correspond to the elements x_{1},....,x_{n}. We also think of Z_{0} as a graph of groups with the underlying graph Z_{0} and the trivial vertex and edge groups. Then the universal cover $\tilde Z_0$ of Z_{0} and the Bass–Serre covering tree for Z_{0} coincide. Consider a φ_{0}-equivariant map $r_0:\tilde Z_0\to \tilde{\mathbf Y}$ so that it sends vertices to vertices and edges to edge-paths. This map is non-injective and, since both the source and the target of the map are trees, this map "folds" some edge-pairs in the source. The graph of groups Z_{0} serves as an initial approximation for Y.

We now start performing a sequence of "folding moves" on Z_{0} (and on its Bass-Serre covering tree) to construct a sequence of graphs of groups Z_{0}, Z_{1}, Z_{2}, ...., that form better and better approximations for Y. Each of the graphs of groups Z_{j} has trivial edge groups and comes with the following additional structure: for each nontrivial vertex group of it there assigned a finite generating set of that vertex group. The complexity c(Z_{j}) of Z_{j} is the sum of the sizes of the generating sets of its vertex groups and the rank of the free group π_{1}(Z_{j}). For the initial approximation graph we have c(Z_{0})=n.

The folding moves that take Z_{j} to Z_{j+1} can be of one of two types:

- folds that identify two edges of the underlying graph with a common initial vertex but distinct end-vertices into a single edge; when such a fold is performed, the generating sets of the vertex groups and the terminal edges are "joined" together into a generating set of the new vertex group; the rank of the fundamental group of the underlying graph does not change under such a move.
- folds that identify two edges, that already had common initial vertices and common terminal vertices, into a single edge; such a move decreases the rank of the fundamental group of the underlying graph by 1 and an element that corresponded to the loop in the graph that is being collapsed is "added" to the generating set of one of the vertex groups.

One sees that the folding moves do not increase complexity but they do decrease the number of edges in Z_{j}. Therefore, the folding process must terminate in a finite number of steps with a graph of groups Z_{k} that cannot be folded any more. It follows from the basic Bass–Serre theory considerations that Z_{k} must in fact be equal to the edge of groups Y and that Z_{k} comes equipped with finite generating sets for the vertex groups A and B. The sum of the sizes of these generating sets is the complexity of Z_{k} which is therefore less than or equal to c(Z_{0})=n. This implies that the sum of the ranks of the vertex groups A and B is at most n, that is rank(A)+rank(B)≤rank(G), as required.

== Sketch of Stalling's proof ==
Stallings' proof of Grushko Theorem follows from the following lemma.

=== Lemma ===
Let F be a finitely generated free group, with n generators. Let G_{1} and G_{2} be two finitely presented groups. Suppose there exists a surjective homomorphism $\phi:F\rightarrow G_1\ast G_2$. Then there exists two subgroups F_{1} and F_{2} of F with $\phi(F_1)=G_1$ and $\phi(F_2)=G_2$, such that $F=F_1\ast F_2.$

Proof: We give the proof assuming that F has no generator which is mapped to the identity of $G_1\ast G_2$, for if there are such generators, they may be added to any of $F_1$ or $F_2$.

The following general results are used in the proof.

1. There is a one or two dimensional CW complex, Z with fundamental group F. By Van Kampen theorem, the wedge of n circles is one such space.

2. There exists a two complex $X=X_1\cup X_2$ where $\{p\}=X_1\cap X_2$ is a point on a one cell of X such that X_{1} and X_{2} are two complexes with fundamental groups G_{1} and G_{2} respectively. Note that by the Van Kampen theorem, this implies that the fundamental group of X is $G_1\ast G_2$.

3. There exists a map $f:Z\rightarrow X$ such that the induced map $f_\ast$ on the fundamental groups is same as $\phi$

For the sake of convenience, let us denote $f^{-1}(X_1)=:Z_1$ and $f^{-1}(X_2)=:Z_2$. Since no generator of F maps to identity, the set $Z_1\cap Z_2$ has no loops, for if it does, these will correspond to circles of Z which map to $p\in X$, which in turn correspond to generators of F which go to the identity. So, the components of $Z_1\cap Z_2$ are contractible. In the case where $Z_1\cap Z_2$ has only one component, by Van Kampen's theorem, we are done, as in that case, :$F=\Pi_1(Z_1)\ast\Pi_1(Z_2)$.

The general proof follows by reducing Z to a space homotopically equivalent to it, but with fewer components in $Z_1\cap Z_2$, and thus by induction on the components of $Z_1\cap Z_2$.

Such a reduction of Z is done by attaching discs along binding ties.

We call a map $\gamma :[0,1]\rightarrow Z$ a binding tie if it satisfies the following properties

1. It is monochromatic i.e. $\gamma([0,1])\subseteq Z_1$ or $\gamma([0,1])\subseteq Z_2$

2. It is a tie i.e. $\gamma(0)$ and $\gamma(1)$ lie in different components of $Z_1\cap Z_2$.

3. It is null i.e. $f \circ \gamma([0,1])$ is null homotopic in X.

Let us assume that such a binding tie exists. Let $\gamma$ be the binding tie.

Consider the map $g:[0,1]\rightarrow D^2$ given by $g(t)= e^{it}$. This map is a homeomorphism onto its image. Define the space $Z'$ as

$Z'= Z \coprod\! D^2/\! \sim$ where :
$$x\!\!\sim y \text{ iff}
\begin{cases}
x=y, \mbox{ or }\\
x=\gamma (t) \text{ and } y= g(t) \text{ for some } t\in [0,1]\mbox{ or }\\
x=g (t) \text{ and } y= \gamma (t) \text{ for some } t\in [0,1]
\end{cases}$$

Note that the space Z' deformation retracts to Z We first extend f to a function $''f'':Z\coprod \partial D^2/\!\sim$ as

$$f''(x) = \begin{cases}f(x),\ x\in Z\\ p \text{ otherwise.}\end{cases}$$

Since the $f(\gamma)$ is null homotopic, $f''$ further extends to the interior of the disc, and therefore, to $Z'$. Let $Z_i' = f'^{-1}(X_i)$ i = 1,2. As $\gamma(0)$ and $\gamma(1)$ lay in different components of $Z_1\cap Z_2$, $Z_1' \cap Z_2'$ has one less component than $Z_1\cap Z_2$.

=== Construction of binding tie ===
The binding tie is constructed in two steps.

Step 1: Constructing a null tie:

Consider a map $\gamma' :[0,1]\rightarrow Z$ with $\gamma' (0)$ and $\gamma' (1)$ in different components of $Z_1\cap Z_2$. Since $f_\ast$ is surjective, there exits a loop $\!\lambda$ based at γ'(1) such that $\! f(\gamma')$ and $\! f(\lambda)$ are homotopically equivalent in X. If we define a curve $\gamma :[0,1]\rightarrow Z$ as $\gamma(t)= \gamma'\ast\lambda(t)$ for all $t\in [0,1]$, then $\!\gamma$ is a null tie.

Step 2: Making the null tie monochromatic:

The tie $\!\gamma$ may be written as $\gamma_1\ast \gamma_2\ast \cdots \ast\gamma_m$ where each $\gamma_i$ is a curve in $Z_1$ or $Z_2$ such that if $\gamma_i$ is in $Z_1$, then $\gamma_{i+1}$ is in $Z_2$ and vice versa. This also implies that $f(\gamma_i)$ is a loop based at p in X. So,

$$[e]=[f(\gamma)]=[f(\gamma_1)]\ast\cdots\ast [f(\gamma_m)]$$

Hence, $[f(\gamma_j)]=[e]$ for some j. If this $\!\gamma_j$ is a tie, then we have a monochromatic, null tie. If $\!\gamma_j$ is not a tie, then the end points of $\!\gamma_j$ are in the same component of $Z_1\cap Z_2$. In this case, we replace $\!\gamma_j$ by a path in $Z_1\cap Z_2$, say $\!\gamma_j'$. This path may be appended to $\!\gamma_{j-1}$ and we get a new null tie

$\gamma '' = \gamma_1\ast \cdots \ast \gamma_{j-1}'\ast\gamma_{j+1} \cdots \gamma_m$, where $\!\gamma_{j-1}' = \gamma_{j-1}\ast\gamma_j'$.

Thus, by induction on m, we prove the existence of a binding tie.

=== Proof of Grushko theorem ===
Suppose that $G = A*B$ is generated by $\{g_1, g_2,\ldots, g_n\}$. Let $F$ be the free group with $n$-generators, viz. $\{f_1, f_2,\ldots, f_n\}$. Consider the homomorphism $h:F\rightarrow G$ given by $h(f_i) = g_i$, where $i=1,\ldots, n$.

By the lemma, there exists free groups $F_1$ and $F_2$ with $F=F_1\ast F_2$ such that $h(F_1)=A$ and $h(F_2)=B$. Therefore, $\text{Rank }(A) \leq \text{Rank }(F_1)$ and $\text{Rank }(B) \leq \text{Rank }(F_2)$. Therefore, $\text{Rank }(A) + \text{Rank }(B)\leq\text{Rank }(F_1) + \text{Rank }(F_2) = \text{Rank }(F) = \text{Rank } (A\ast B).$

== See also ==
- Bass–Serre theory
- Generating set of a group
