= Stallings theorem about ends of groups =

Theorem in group theory

In the mathematical subject of group theory, the Stallings theorem about ends of groups states that a finitely generated group $G$ has more than one end if and only if the group $G$ admits a nontrivial decomposition as an amalgamated free product or an HNN extension over a finite subgroup. In the modern language of Bass–Serre theory the theorem says that a finitely generated group $G$ has more than one end if and only if $G$ admits a nontrivial (that is, without a global fixed point) action on a simplicial tree with finite edge-stabilizers and without edge-inversions.

The theorem was proved by John R. Stallings, first in the torsion-free case (1968) and then in the general case (1971).

== Ends of graphs ==
Let $\Gamma$ be a connected graph where the degree of every vertex is finite. One can view $\Gamma$ as a topological space by giving it the natural structure of a one-dimensional cell complex. Then the ends of $\Gamma$ are the ends of this topological space. A more explicit definition of the number of ends of a graph is presented below for completeness.

Let $n \geqslant 0$ be a non-negative integer. The graph $\Gamma$ is said to satisfy $e(\Gamma) \leqslant n$ if for every finite collection $F$ of edges of $\Gamma$ the graph $\Gamma - F$ has at most $n$ infinite connected components. By definition, $e(\Gamma) = m$ if $e(\Gamma) \leqslant m$ and if for every $0 \leqslant n < m$ the statement $e(\Gamma) \leqslant n$ is false. Thus $e(\Gamma) = m$ if $m$ is the smallest nonnegative integer $n$ such that $e(\Gamma) \leqslant n$. If there does not exist an integer $n \geqslant 0$ such that $e(\Gamma) \leqslant n$, put $e(\Gamma) = \infty$. The number $e(\Gamma)$ is called the number of ends of $\Gamma$.

Informally, $e(\Gamma)$ is the number of "connected components at infinity" of $\Gamma$. If $e(\Gamma) = m < \infty$, then for any finite set $F$ of edges of $\Gamma$ there exists a finite set $K$ of edges of $\Gamma$ with $F \subseteq K$ such that $\Gamma - F$ has exactly $m$ infinite connected components. If $e(\Gamma) = \infty$, then for any finite set $F$ of edges of $\Gamma$ and for any integer $n \geqslant 0$ there exists a finite set $K$ of edges of $\Gamma$ with $F \subseteq K$ such that $\Gamma - K$ has at least $n$ infinite connected components.

== Ends of groups ==
Let $G$ be a finitely generated group. Let $S \subseteq G$ be a finite generating set of $G$ and let $\Gamma(G,S)$ be the Cayley graph of $G$ with respect to $S$. The number of ends of $G$ is defined as $e(G) = e(\Gamma(G,S))$. A basic fact in the theory of ends of groups says that $e(\Gamma(G,S))$ does not depend on the choice of a finite generating set $S$ of $G$, so that $e(G)$ is well-defined.

=== Basic facts and examples ===
- For a finitely generated group $G$ we have $e(G)=0$ if and only if $G$ is finite.
- For the infinite cyclic group $\mathbb Z$ we have $e(\mathbb Z)=2.$
- For the free abelian group of rank two $\mathbb Z^2$ we have $e(\mathbb Z^2)=1.$
- For a free group $F(X)$ where $1 < |X| < \infty$ we have $e(F(X)) = \infty$.

=== Freudenthal-Hopf theorems ===
Hans Freudenthal and independently Heinz Hopf established in the 1940s the following two facts:

- For any finitely generated group $G$ we have $e(G) \in \{0,1,2,\infty\}$.
- For any finitely generated group $G$ we have $e(G) = 2$ if and only if $G$ is virtually infinite cyclic (that is, $G$ contains an infinite cyclic subgroup of finite index).

Charles T. C. Wall proved in 1967 the following complementary fact:

- A group $G$ is virtually infinite cyclic if and only if it has a finite normal subgroup $W$ such that $G/W$ is either infinite cyclic or infinite dihedral.

=== Cuts and almost invariant sets ===
Let $G$ be a finitely generated group, $S \subseteq G$ be a finite generating set of $G$ and let $\Gamma = \Gamma(G,S)$ be the Cayley graph of $G$ with respect to $S$. For a subset $A \subseteq G$ denote by $A^*$ the complement $G-A$ of $A$ in $G$.

For a subset $A \subseteq G$, the edge boundary or the co-boundary $\delta A$ of $A$ consists of all (topological) edges of $\Gamma$ connecting a vertex from $A$ with a vertex from $A^*$. Note that by definition $\delta A = \delta A^*$.

An ordered pair $(A,A^*)$ is called a cut in $\Gamma$ if $\delta A$ is finite. A cut $(A,A^*)$ is called essential if both the sets $A$ and $A^*$ are infinite.

A subset $A \subseteq G$ is called almost invariant if for every $g \in G$ the symmetric difference between $A$ and $Ag$ is finite. It is easy to see that $(A,A^*)$ is a cut if and only if the sets $A$ and $A^*$ are almost invariant (equivalently, if and only if the set $A$ is almost invariant).

==== Cuts and ends ====
A simple but important observation states:

$e(G) > 1$ if and only if there exists at least one essential cut $(A,A^*)$ in Γ.

==== Cuts and splittings over finite groups ====
If $G = H*K$ where $H$ and $K$ are nontrivial finitely generated groups then the Cayley graph of $G$ has at least one essential cut and hence $e(G) > 1$. Indeed, let $X$ and $Y$ be finite generating sets for $H$ and $K$ accordingly so that $S = X \cup Y$ is a finite generating set for $G$ and let $\Gamma = \Gamma(G,S)$ be the Cayley graph of $G$ with respect to $S$. Let $A$ consist of the trivial element and all the elements of $G$ whose normal form expressions for $G = H*K$ starts with a nontrivial element of $H$. Thus $A^*$ consists of all elements of $G$ whose normal form expressions for $G = H*K$ starts with a nontrivial element of $K$. It is not hard to see that $(A,A^*)$ is an essential cut in Γ so that $e(G) > 1$.

A more precise version of this argument shows that for a finitely generated group $G$:

- If $G = H*_CK$ is a free product with amalgamation where $C$ is a finite group such that $C \neq H$ and $C \neq K$ then $H$ and $K$ are finitely generated and $e(G) > 1$ .
- If $G=\langle H, t| t^{-1}C_1t=C_2\rangle$ is an HNN-extension where $C_1$, $C_2$ are isomorphic finite subgroups of $H$ then $G$ is a finitely generated group and $e(G) > 1$.

Stallings' theorem shows that the converse is also true.

== Formal statement of Stallings' theorem ==
Let $G$ be a finitely generated group.

Then $e(G) > 1$ if and only if one of the following holds:

- The group $G$ admits a splitting $G = H*_C K$ as a free product with amalgamation where $C$ is a finite group such that $C \neq H$ and $C \neq K$.
- The group $G$ is an HNN extension $G=\langle H, t| t^{-1}C_1t=C_2\rangle$ where and $C_1$, $C_2$ are isomorphic finite subgroups of $H$.

In the language of Bass–Serre theory this result can be restated as follows: For a finitely generated group $G$ we have $e(G) > 1$ if and only if $G$ admits a nontrivial (that is, without a global fixed vertex) action on a simplicial tree with finite edge-stabilizers and without edge-inversions.

For the case where $G$ is a torsion-free finitely generated group, Stallings' theorem implies that $e(G) = \infty$ if and only if $G$ admits a proper free product decomposition $G = A* B$ with both $A$ and $B$ nontrivial.

== Applications and generalizations ==
- Among the immediate applications of Stallings' theorem was a proof by Stallings of a long-standing conjecture that every finitely generated group of cohomological dimension one is free and that every torsion-free virtually free group is free.
- Stallings' theorem also implies that the property of having a nontrivial splitting over a finite subgroup is a quasi-isometry invariant of a finitely generated group since the number of ends of a finitely generated group is easily seen to be a quasi-isometry invariant. For this reason Stallings' theorem is considered to be one of the first results in geometric group theory.
- Stallings' theorem was a starting point for Dunwoody's accessibility theory. A finitely generated group $G$ is said to be accessible if the process of iterated nontrivial splitting of $G$ over finite subgroups always terminates in a finite number of steps. In Bass–Serre theory terms that the number of edges in a reduced splitting of $G$ as the fundamental group of a graph of groups with finite edge groups is bounded by some constant depending on $G$. Dunwoody proved that every finitely presented group is accessible but that there do exist finitely generated groups that are not accessible. Linnell showed that if one bounds the size of finite subgroups over which the splittings are taken then every finitely generated group is accessible in this sense as well. These results in turn gave rise to other versions of accessibility such as Bestvina-Feighn accessibility of finitely presented groups (where the so-called "small" splittings are considered), acylindrical accessibility, strong accessibility, and others.
- Stallings' theorem is a key tool in proving that a finitely generated group $G$ is virtually free if and only if $G$ can be represented as the fundamental group of a finite graph of groups where all vertex and edge groups are finite (see, for example,).
- Using Dunwoody's accessibility result, Stallings' theorem about ends of groups and the fact that if $G$ is a finitely presented group with asymptotic dimension 1 then $G$ is virtually free one can show that for a finitely presented word-hyperbolic group $G$ the hyperbolic boundary of $G$ has topological dimension zero if and only if $G$ is virtually free.
- Relative versions of Stallings' theorem and relative ends of finitely generated groups with respect to subgroups have also been considered. For a subgroup $H \leqslant G$ of a finitely generated group $G$ one defines the number of relative ends $e(G,H)$ as the number of ends of the relative Cayley graph (the Schreier coset graph) of $G$ with respect to $H$. The case where $e(G,H) > 1$ is called a semi-splitting of $G$ over $H$. Early work on semi-splittings, inspired by Stallings' theorem, was done in the 1970s and 1980s by Scott, Swarup, and others. The work of Sageev and Gerasimov in the 1990s showed that for a subgroup $H \leqslant G$ the condition $e(G,H) > 1$ corresponds to the group $G$ admitting an essential isometric action on a CAT(0)-cubing where a subgroup commensurable with $H$ stabilizes an essential "hyperplane" (a simplicial tree is an example of a CAT(0)-cubing where the hyperplanes are the midpoints of edges). In certain situations such a semi-splitting can be promoted to an actual algebraic splitting, typically over a subgroup commensurable with $H$, such as for the case where $H$ is finite (Stallings' theorem). Another situation where an actual splitting can be obtained (modulo a few exceptions) is for semi-splittings over virtually polycyclic subgroups. Here the case of semi-splittings of word-hyperbolic groups over two-ended (virtually infinite cyclic) subgroups was treated by Scott-Swarup and by Bowditch. The case of semi-splittings of finitely generated groups with respect to virtually polycyclic subgroups is dealt with by the algebraic torus theorem of Dunwoody-Swenson.
- A number of new proofs of Stallings' theorem have been obtained by others after Stallings' original proof. Dunwoody gave a proof based on the ideas of edge-cuts. Later Dunwoody also gave a proof of Stallings' theorem for finitely presented groups using the method of "tracks" on finite 2-complexes. Niblo obtained a proof of Stallings' theorem as a consequence of Sageev's CAT(0)-cubing relative version, where the CAT(0)-cubing is eventually promoted to being a tree. Niblo's paper also defines an abstract group-theoretic obstruction (which is a union of double cosets of $H$ in $G$) for obtaining an actual splitting from a semi-splitting. It is also possible to prove Stallings' theorem for finitely presented groups using Riemannian geometry techniques of minimal surfaces, where one first realizes a finitely presented group as the fundamental group of a compact $4$-manifold (see, for example, a sketch of this argument in the survey article of Wall). Gromov outlined a proof (see pp. 228–230 in) where the minimal surfaces argument is replaced by an easier harmonic analysis argument and this approach was pushed further by Kapovich to cover the original case of finitely generated groups.

== See also ==
- Free product with amalgamation
- HNN extension
- Bass–Serre theory
- Graph of groups
- Geometric group theory
