= Kurosh subgroup theorem =

Mathematical theorem for algebraic structure of subgroups of free products

In the mathematical field of group theory, the Kurosh subgroup theorem describes the algebraic structure of subgroups of free products of groups. The theorem was obtained by Alexander Kurosh, a Russian mathematician, in 1934. Informally, the theorem says that every subgroup of a free product is itself a free product of a free group and of its intersections with the conjugates of the factors of the original free product.

== History and generalizations ==
After the original 1934 proof of Kurosh, there were many subsequent proofs of the Kurosh subgroup theorem, including proofs of Harold W. Kuhn (1952), Saunders Mac Lane (1958) and others. The theorem was also generalized for describing subgroups of amalgamated free products and HNN extensions. Other generalizations include considering subgroups of free pro-finite products and a version of the Kurosh subgroup theorem for topological groups.

In modern terms, the Kurosh subgroup theorem is a straightforward corollary of the basic structural results of Bass–Serre theory about groups acting on trees.

== Statement of the theorem ==
Let $G = A*B$ be the free product of groups A and B and let $H \le G$ be a subgroup of G. Then there exist a family $(A_i)_{i\in I}$ of subgroups $A_i \le A$, a family $(B_j)_{j\in J}$ of subgroups $B_j \le B$, families $g_i, i\in I$ and $f_j, j\in J$ of elements of G, and a subset $X\subseteq G$ such that

$$H=F(X)*(*_{i\in I} g_i A_ig_i^{-1})* (*_{j\in J} f_jB_jf_j^{-1}).$$

This means that X freely generates a subgroup of G isomorphic to the free group F(X) with free basis X and that, moreover, g_{i}A_{i}g_{i}^{−1}, f_{j}B_{j}f_{j}^{−1} and X generate H in G as a free product of the above form.

There is a generalization of this to the case of free products with arbitrarily many factors. Its formulation is:

If H is a subgroup of ∗_{i∈I}G_{i} = G, then

$$H=F(X)*(*_{j\in J} g_jH_jg_j^{-1}),$$

where X ⊆ G and J is some index set and g_{j} ∈ G and each H_{j} is a subgroup of some G_{i}.

== Proof using Bass–Serre theory ==
The Kurosh subgroup theorem easily follows from the basic structural results in Bass–Serre theory, as explained, for example in the book of Cohen (1987):

Let G = A∗B and consider G as the fundamental group of a graph of groups Y consisting of a single non-loop edge with the vertex groups A and B and with the trivial edge group. Let X be the Bass–Serre universal covering tree for the graph of groups Y. Since H ≤ G also acts on X, consider the quotient graph of groups Z for the action of H on X. The vertex groups of Z are subgroups of G-stabilizers of vertices of X, that is, they are conjugate in G to subgroups of A and B. The edge groups of Z are trivial since the G-stabilizers of edges of X were trivial. By the fundamental theorem of Bass–Serre theory, H is canonically isomorphic to the fundamental group of the graph of groups Z. Since the edge groups of Z are trivial, it follows that H is equal to the free product of the vertex groups of Z and the free group F(X) which is the fundamental group (in the standard topological sense) of the underlying graph Z of Z. This implies the conclusion of the Kurosh subgroup theorem.

== Extension ==
The result extends to the case that G is the amalgamated product along a common subgroup C, under the condition that H meets every conjugate of C only in the identity element.

== See also ==
- HNN extension
- Geometric group theory
- Nielsen–Schreier theorem
