= SQ-universal group =

Type of countable group in group theory

In mathematics, in the realm of group theory, a countable group is said to be SQ-universal if every countable group can be embedded in one of its quotient groups. SQ-universality can be thought of as a measure of largeness or complexity of a group.

== History ==
Many classic results of combinatorial group theory, going back to 1949, are now interpreted as saying that a particular group or class of groups is (are) SQ-universal. However the first explicit use of the term seems to be in an address given by Peter Neumann to The London Algebra Colloquium entitled "SQ-universal groups" on 23 May 1968.

== Examples of SQ-universal groups ==
In 1949 Graham Higman, Bernhard Neumann and Hanna Neumann proved that every countable group can be embedded in a two-generator group. Using the contemporary language of SQ-universality, this result says that F_{2}, the free group (non-abelian) on two generators, is SQ-universal. This is the first known example of an SQ-universal group. Many more examples are now known:

- Adding two generators and one arbitrary relator to a nontrivial torsion-free group, always results in an SQ-universal group.
- Any non-elementary group that is hyperbolic with respect to a collection of proper subgroups is SQ-universal.
- Many HNN extensions, free products and free products with amalgamation.
- The four-generator Coxeter group with presentation:

$$P=\left\langle a,b,c,d\,|\, a^{2}=b^{2}=c^{2}=d^{2}=(ab)^{3}=(bc)^{3}=(ac)^{3}=(ad)^{3}=(cd)^{3}=(bd)^{3}=1\right\rangle$$

- Charles F. Miller III's example of a finitely presented SQ-universal group all of whose non-trivial quotients have unsolvable word problem.

In addition much stronger versions of the Higmann-Neumann-Neumann theorem are now known. Ould Houcine has proved:

For every countable group G there exists a 2-generator SQ-universal group H such that G can be embedded in every non-trivial quotient of H.

== Some elementary properties of SQ-universal groups ==
A free group on countably many generators h_{1}, h_{2}, ..., h_{n}, ... , say, must be embeddable in a quotient of an SQ-universal group G. If $h^*_1,h^*_2, \dots ,h^*_n \dots \in G$ are chosen such that $h^*_n \mapsto h_n$ for all n, then they must freely generate a free subgroup of G. Hence:

Every SQ-universal group has as a subgroup, a free group on countably many generators.

Since every countable group can be embedded in a countable simple group, it is often sufficient to consider embeddings of simple groups. This observation allows us to easily prove some elementary results about SQ-universal groups, for instance:

If G is an SQ-universal group and N is a normal subgroup of G (i.e. $N\triangleleft G$) then either N is SQ-universal or the quotient group G/N is SQ-universal.

To prove this suppose N is not SQ-universal, then there is a countable group K that cannot be embedded into a quotient group of N. Let H be any countable group, then the direct product H × K is also countable and hence can be embedded in a countable simple group S. Now, by hypothesis, G is SQ-universal so S can be embedded in a quotient group, G/M, say, of G. The second isomorphism theorem tells us:

$$MN/M \cong N/(M \cap N)$$

Now $MN/M\triangleleft G/M$ and S is a simple subgroup of G/M so either:

$$MN/M \cap S \cong 1$$

or:

$$S\subseteq MN/M \cong N/(M \cap N)$$.

The latter cannot be true because it implies K ⊆ H × K ⊆ S ⊆ N/(M ∩ N) contrary to our choice of K. It follows that S can be embedded in (G/M)/(MN/M), which by the third isomorphism theorem is isomorphic to G/MN, which is in turn isomorphic to (G/N)/(MN/N). Thus S has been embedded into a quotient group of G/N, and since H ⊆ S was an arbitrary countable group, it follows that G/N is SQ-universal.

Since every subgroup H of finite index in a group G contains a normal subgroup N also of finite index in G, it easily follows that:

If a group G is SQ-universal then so is any finite index subgroup H of G. The converse of this statement is also true.

== Variants and generalizations of SQ-universality ==
Several variants of SQ-universality occur in the literature. The reader should be warned that terminology in this area is not yet completely stable and should read this section with this caveat in mind.

Let $\mathcal{P}$ be a class of groups. (For the purposes of this section, groups are defined up to isomorphism) A group G is called SQ-universal in the class $\mathcal{P}$ if $G\in \mathcal{P}$ and every countable group in $\mathcal{P}$ is isomorphic to a subgroup of a quotient of G. The following result can be proved:

Let n, m ∈ Z where m is odd, $n>10^{78}$ and m > 1, and let B(m, n) be the free m-generator Burnside group, then every non-cyclic subgroup of B(m, n) is SQ-universal in the class of groups of exponent n.

Let $\mathcal{P}$ be a class of groups. A group G is called SQ-universal for the class $\mathcal{P}$ if every group in $\mathcal{P}$ is isomorphic to a subgroup of a quotient of G. Note that there is no requirement that $G\in \mathcal{P}$ nor that any groups be countable.

The standard definition of SQ-universality is equivalent to SQ-universality both in and for the class of countable groups.

Given a countable group G, call an SQ-universal group H G-stable, if every non-trivial factor group of H contains a copy of G. Let $\mathcal{G}$ be the class of finitely presented SQ-universal groups that are G-stable for some G then Houcine's version of the HNN theorem that can be re-stated as:

The free group on two generators is SQ-universal for $\mathcal{G}$.

However, there are uncountably many finitely generated groups, and a countable group can only have countably many finitely generated subgroups. It is easy to see from this that:

No group can be SQ-universal in $\mathcal{G}$.

An infinite class $\mathcal{P}$ of groups is wrappable if given any groups $F,G\in \mathcal{P}$ there exists a simple group S and a group $H\in \mathcal{P}$ such that F and G can be embedded in S and S can be embedded in H. The it is easy to prove:

If $\mathcal{P}$ is a wrappable class of groups, G is an SQ-universal for $\mathcal{P}$ and $N\triangleleft G$ then either N is SQ-universal for $\mathcal{P}$ or G/N is SQ-universal for $\mathcal{P}$.

If $\mathcal{P}$ is a wrappable class of groups and H is of finite index in G then G is SQ-universal for the class $\mathcal{P}$ if and only if H is SQ-universal for $\mathcal{P}$.

The motivation for the definition of wrappable class comes from results such as the Boone-Higman theorem, which states that a countable group G has soluble word problem if and only if it can be embedded in a simple group S that can be embedded in a finitely presented group F. Houcine has shown that the group F can be constructed so that it too has soluble word problem. This together with the fact that taking the direct product of two groups preserves solubility of the word problem shows that:

The class of all finitely presented groups with soluble word problem is wrappable.

Other examples of wrappable classes of groups are:

- The class of finite groups.
- The class of torsion free groups.
- The class of countable torsion free groups.
- The class of all groups of a given infinite cardinality.

The fact that a class $\mathcal{P}$ is wrappable does not imply that any groups are SQ-universal for $\mathcal{P}$. It is clear, for instance, that some sort of cardinality restriction for the members of $\mathcal{P}$ is required.

If we replace the phrase "isomorphic to a subgroup of a quotient of" with "isomorphic to a subgroup of" in the definition of "SQ-universal", we obtain the stronger concept of S-universal (respectively S-universal for/in $\mathcal{P}$). The Higman Embedding Theorem can be used to prove that there is a finitely presented group that contains a copy of every finitely presented group. If $\mathcal{W}$ is the class of all finitely presented groups with soluble word problem, then it is known that there is no uniform algorithm to solve the word problem for groups in $\mathcal{W}$. It follows, although the proof is not a straightforward as one might expect, that no group in $\mathcal{W}$ can contain a copy of every group in $\mathcal{W}$. But it is clear that any SQ-universal group is a fortiori SQ-universal for $\mathcal{W}$. If we let $\mathcal{F}$ be the class of finitely presented groups, and F_{2} be the free group on two generators, we can sum this up as:

- F_{2} is SQ-universal in $\mathcal{F}$ and $\mathcal{W}$.
- There exists a group that is S-universal in $\mathcal{F}$.
- No group is S-universal in $\mathcal{W}$.

The following questions are open (the second implies the first):

- Is there a countable group that is not SQ-universal but is SQ-universal for $\mathcal{W}$?
- Is there a countable group that is not SQ-universal but is SQ-universal in $\mathcal{W}$?

While it is quite difficult to prove that F_{2} is SQ-universal, the fact that it is SQ-universal for the class of finite groups follows easily from these two facts:

- Every symmetric group on a finite set can be generated by two elements
- Every finite group can be embedded inside a symmetric group—the natural one being the Cayley group, which is the symmetric group acting on this group as the finite set.

== SQ-universality in other categories ==
If $\mathcal{C}$ is a category and $\mathcal{P}$ is a class of objects of $\mathcal{C}$, then the definition of SQ-universal for $\mathcal{P}$ clearly makes sense. If $\mathcal{C}$ is a concrete category, then the definition of SQ-universal in $\mathcal{P}$ also makes sense. As in the group theoretic case, we use the term SQ-universal for an object that is SQ-universal both for and in the class of countable objects of $\mathcal{C}$.

Many embedding theorems can be restated in terms of SQ-universality. Shirshov's Theorem that a Lie algebra of finite or countable dimension can be embedded into a 2-generator Lie algebra is equivalent to the statement that the 2-generator free Lie algebra is SQ-universal (in the category of Lie algebras). This can be proved by proving a version of the Higman, Neumann, Neumann theorem for Lie algebras. However versions of the HNN theorem can be proved for categories where there is no clear idea of a free object. For instance it can be proved that every separable topological group is isomorphic to a topological subgroup of a group having two topological generators (that is, having a dense 2-generator subgroup).

A similar concept holds for free lattices. The free lattice in three generators is countably infinite. It has, as a sublattice, the free lattice in four generators, and, by induction, as a sublattice, the free lattice in a countable number of generators.
