= Bass–Serre theory =

Part of the mathematical subject of group theory

Bass–Serre theory is a part of the mathematical subject of group theory that deals with analyzing the algebraic structure of groups acting by automorphisms on simplicial trees. The theory relates group actions on trees with decomposing groups as iterated applications of the operations of free product with amalgamation and HNN extension, via the notion of the fundamental group of a graph of groups. Bass–Serre theory has some overlap with orbifold theory, as some one-dimensional orbifolds may be described as graphs of groups.

== History ==
Bass–Serre theory was developed by Jean-Pierre Serre in the 1970s and formalized in Trees, Serre's 1977 monograph (developed in collaboration with Hyman Bass) on the subject. Serre's original motivation was to understand the structure of certain algebraic groups whose Bruhat–Tits buildings are trees. However, the theory quickly became a standard tool of geometric group theory and geometric topology, particularly the study of 3-manifolds. Subsequent work of Bass contributed substantially to the formalization and development of basic tools of the theory and currently the term "Bass–Serre theory" is widely used to describe the subject.

Mathematically, Bass–Serre theory builds on exploiting and generalizing the properties of two older group-theoretic constructions: free product with amalgamation and HNN extension. However, unlike the traditional algebraic study of these two constructions, Bass–Serre theory uses the geometric language of covering theory and fundamental groups. Graphs of groups, which are the basic objects of Bass–Serre theory, can be viewed as one-dimensional versions of orbifolds.

Apart from Serre's book, the basic treatment of Bass–Serre theory is available in the article of Bass, the article of G. Peter Scott and C. T. C. Wall and the books of Allen Hatcher, Gilbert Baumslag, Warren Dicks and Martin Dunwoody and Daniel E. Cohen.

== Basic set-up ==
=== Graphs in the sense of Serre ===
Serre's formalism of graphs is slightly different from the standard formalism from graph theory. Here a graph A consists of a vertex set V, an edge set E, an edge reversal map $E\to E,\ e\mapsto \overline{e}$ such that e̅ ≠ e and $\overline{\overline{e}}= e$ for every e in E, and an initial vertex map $o\colon E\to V$. Thus in A every edge e comes equipped with its formal inverse e̅. The vertex o(e) is called the origin or the initial vertex of e and the vertex o(e̅) is called the terminus of e and is denoted t(e). Both loop-edges (that is, edges e such that o(e) = t(e)) and multiple edges are allowed. An orientation on A is a partition of E into the union of two disjoint subsets E^{+} and E^{−} so that for every edge e exactly one of the edges from the pair e, e̅ belongs to E^{+} and the other belongs to E^{−}.

=== Graphs of groups ===
A graph of groups A consists of the following data:

- A connected graph A;
- An assignment of a vertex group A_{v} to every vertex v of A.
- An assignment of an edge group A_{e} to every edge e of A so that we have $A_e=A_{\overline e}$ for every e ∈ E.
- Boundary monomorphisms $\alpha_e: A_e\to A_{o(e)}$ for all edges e of A, so that each $\alpha_e$ is an injective group homomorphism.

For every $e\in E$ the map $\alpha_{\overline e}\colon A_e\to A_{t(e)}$ is also denoted by $\omega_e$.

=== Fundamental group of a graph of groups ===
There are two equivalent definitions of the notion of the fundamental group of a graph of groups: the first is a direct algebraic definition via an explicit group presentation (as a certain iterated application of amalgamated free products and HNN extensions), and the second using the language of groupoids.

The algebraic definition is easier to state:

First, choose a spanning tree T in A. The fundamental group of A with respect to T, denoted π_{1}(A, T), is defined as the quotient of the free product

$$(\ast_{v\in V} A_v) \ast F(E)$$

where F(E) is a free group with free basis E, subject to the following relations:

- $\overline{e} \alpha_e(g)e=\alpha_{\overline{e}}(g)$ for every e in E and every $g\in A_e$. (The so-called Bass–Serre relation.)
- e̅e = 1 for every e in E.
- e = 1 for every edge e of the spanning tree T.

There is also a notion of the fundamental group of A with respect to a base-vertex v in V, denoted π_{1}(A, v), which is defined using the formalism of groupoids. It turns out that for every choice of a base-vertex v and every spanning tree T in A the groups π_{1}(A, T) and π_{1}(A, v) are naturally isomorphic.

The fundamental group of a graph of groups has a natural topological interpretation as well: it is the fundamental group of a graph of spaces whose vertex spaces and edge spaces have the fundamental groups of the vertex groups and edge groups, respectively, and whose gluing maps induce the homomorphisms of the edge groups into the vertex groups. One can therefore take this as a third definition of the fundamental group of a graph of groups.

==== Fundamental groups of graphs of groups as iterations of amalgamated products and HNN-extensions ====
The group G = π_{1}(A, T) defined above admits an algebraic description in terms of iterated amalgamated free products and HNN extensions. First, form a group B as a quotient of the free product

$$(\ast_{v\in V} A_v)*F(E^+T)$$

subject to the relations

- e^{−1}α_{e}(g)e = ω_{e}(g) for every e in E^{+}T and every $g\in A_e$.
- e = 1 for every e in E^{+}T.

This presentation can be rewritten as

$$B=\ast_{v\in V} A_v/{\rm ncl}\{\alpha_e(g)=\omega_e(g), \text{ where }e\in E^+T, g\in G_e\}$$

which shows that B is an iterated amalgamated free product of the vertex groups A_{v}.

Then the group G = π_{1}(A, T) has the presentation

$$\langle B, E^+(A-T)| e^{-1}\alpha_e(g)e=\omega_e(g) \text{ where }e\in E^+(A-T), g\in G_e \rangle ,$$

which shows that G = π_{1}(A, T) is a multiple HNN extension of B with stable letters $\{e| e\in E^+(A-T)\}$.

=== Splittings ===
An isomorphism between a group G and the fundamental group of a graph of groups is called a splitting of G. If the edge groups in the splitting come from a particular class of groups (e.g. finite, cyclic, abelian, etc.), the splitting is said to be a splitting over that class. Thus a splitting where all edge groups are finite is called a splitting over finite groups.

Algebraically, a splitting of G with trivial edge groups corresponds to a free product decomposition

$$G=(\ast A_v)\ast F(X)$$

where F(X) is a free group with free basis X = E^{+}(A−T) consisting of all positively oriented edges (with respect to some orientation on A) in the complement of some spanning tree T of A.

=== The normal forms theorem ===
Let g be an element of G = π_{1}(A, T) represented as a product of the form

$$g=a_0e_1a_1\dots e_na_n,$$

where e_{1}, ..., e_{n} is a closed edge-path in A with the vertex sequence v_{0}, v_{1}, ..., v_{n} = v_{0} (that is v_{0}=o(e_{1}), v_{n} = t(e_{n}) and v_{i} = t(e_{i}) = o(e_{i+1}) for 0 < i < n) and where $a_i\in A_{v_i}$ for i = 0, ..., n.

Suppose that g = 1 in G. Then

- either n = 0 and a_{0} = 1 in $A_{v_0}$,
- or n > 0 and there is some 0 < i < n such that e_{i+1} = e̅_{i̅} and $a_i\in \omega_{e_i}(A_{e_i})$.

The normal forms theorem immediately implies that the canonical homomorphisms A_{v} → π_{1}(A, T) are injective, so that we can think of the vertex groups A_{v} as subgroups of G.

Higgins has given a nice version of the normal form using the fundamental groupoid of a graph of groups. This avoids choosing a base point or tree, and has been exploited by Moore.

== Bass–Serre covering trees ==
To every graph of groups A, with a specified choice of a base-vertex, one can associate a Bass–Serre covering tree $\tilde {\mathbf A}$, which is a tree that comes equipped with a natural group action of the fundamental group π_{1}(A, v) without edge-inversions. Moreover, the quotient graph $\tilde {\mathbf A}/\pi_1(\mathbf A,v)$ is isomorphic to A.

Similarly, if G is a group acting on a tree X without edge-inversions (that is, so that for every edge e of X and every g in G we have ge ≠ e̅), one can define the natural notion of a quotient graph of groups A. The underlying graph A of A is the quotient graph X/G. The vertex groups of A are isomorphic to vertex stabilizers in G of vertices of X and the edge groups of A are isomorphic to edge stabilizers in G of edges of X.

Moreover, if X was the Bass–Serre covering tree of a graph of groups A and if G = π_{1}(A, v) then the quotient graph of groups for the action of G on X can be chosen to be naturally isomorphic to A.

== Fundamental theorem of Bass–Serre theory ==
Let G be a group acting on a tree X without inversions. Let A be the quotient graph of groups and let v be a base-vertex in A. Then G is isomorphic to the group π_{1}(A, v) and there is an equivariant isomorphism between the tree X and the Bass–Serre covering tree $\tilde {\mathbf A}$. More precisely, there is a group isomorphism σ: G → π_{1}(A, v) and a graph isomorphism $j:X\to \tilde {\mathbf A}$ such that for every g in G, for every vertex x of X and for every edge e of X we have j(gx) = g j(x) and j(ge) = g j(e).

This result is also known as the structure theorem.

One of the immediate consequences is the classic Kurosh subgroup theorem describing the algebraic structure of subgroups of free products.

== Examples ==
=== Amalgamated free product ===
Consider a graph of groups A consisting of a single non-loop edge e (together with its formal inverse e̅) with two distinct end-vertices u = o(e) and v = t(e), vertex groups H = A_{u}, K = A_{v}, an edge group C = A_{e} and the boundary monomorphisms $\alpha=\alpha_e:C\to H, \omega=\omega_e:C\to K$. Then T = A is a spanning tree in A and the fundamental group π_{1}(A, T) is isomorphic to the amalgamated free product

$$G=H\ast_C K=H\ast K/{\rm ncl}\{\alpha(c)=\omega(c), c\in C\}.$$

In this case the Bass–Serre tree $X=\tilde{\mathbf A}$ can be described as follows. The vertex set of X is the set of cosets

$$VX= \{gK:g\in G\}\sqcup \{gH:g\in G\}.$$

Two vertices gK and fH are adjacent in X whenever there exists k ∈ K such that fH = gkH (or, equivalently, whenever there is h ∈ H such that gK = fhK).

The G-stabilizer of every vertex of X of type gK is equal to gKg^{−1} and the G-stabilizer of every vertex of X of type gH is equal to gHg^{−1}. For an edge [gH, ghK] of X its G-stabilizer is equal to ghα(C)h^{−1}g^{−1}.

For every c ∈ C and h ∈ 'k ∈ K' the edges [gH, ghK] and [gH, ghα(c)K] are equal and the degree of the vertex gH in X is equal to the index [H:α(C)]. Similarly, every vertex of type gK has degree [K:ω(C)] in X.

=== HNN extension ===
Let A be a graph of groups consisting of a single loop-edge e (together with its formal inverse e̅), a single vertex v = o(e) = t(e), a vertex group B = A_{v}, an edge group C = A_{e} and the boundary monomorphisms $\alpha=\alpha_e:C\to B, \omega=\omega_e:C\to B$. Then T = v is a spanning tree in A and the fundamental group π_{1}(A, T) is isomorphic to the HNN extension

$$G = \langle B, e| e^{-1}\alpha(c)e=\omega(c), c\in C\rangle.$$

with the base group B, stable letter e and the associated subgroups H = α(C), K = ω(C) in B. The composition $\phi=\omega \circ \alpha^{-1}:H\to K$ is an isomorphism and the above HNN-extension presentation of G can be rewritten as

$$G = \langle B, e| e^{-1}he=\phi(h), h\in H\rangle. \,$$

In this case the Bass–Serre tree $X=\tilde{\mathbf A}$ can be described as follows. The vertex set of X is the set of cosets VX = {gB : g ∈ G}.

Two vertices gB and fB are adjacent in X whenever there exists b in B such that either fB = gbeB or fB = gbe^{−1}B. The G-stabilizer of every vertex of X is conjugate to B in G and the stabilizer of every edge of X is conjugate to H in G. Every vertex of X has degree equal to [B : H] + [B : K].

=== A graph with the trivial graph of groups structure ===
Let A be a graph of groups with underlying graph A such that all the vertex and edge groups in A are trivial. Let v be a base-vertex in A. Then π_{1}(A,v) is equal to the fundamental group π_{1}(A,v) of the underlying graph A in the standard sense of algebraic topology and the Bass–Serre covering tree $\tilde{\mathbf A}$ is equal to the standard universal covering space $\tilde{A}$ of A. Moreover, the action of π_{1}(A,v) on $\tilde{\mathbf A}$ is exactly the standard action of π_{1}(A,v) on $\tilde{A}$ by deck transformations.

== Basic facts and properties ==
- If A is a graph of groups with a spanning tree T and if G = π_{1}(A, T), then for every vertex v of A the canonical homomorphism from A_{v} to G is injective.
- If g ∈ G is an element of finite order then g is conjugate in G to an element of finite order in some vertex group A_{v}.
- If F ≤ G is a finite subgroup then F is conjugate in G to a subgroup of some vertex group A_{v}.
- If the graph A is finite and all vertex groups A_{v} are finite then the group G is virtually free, that is, G contains a free subgroup of finite index.
- If A is finite and all the vertex groups A_{v} are finitely generated then G is finitely generated.
- If A is finite and all the vertex groups A_{v} are finitely presented and all the edge groups A_{e} are finitely generated then G is finitely presented.

== Trivial and nontrivial actions ==
A graph of groups A is called trivial if A = T is already a tree and there is some vertex v of A such that A_{v} = π_{1}(A, A). This is equivalent to the condition that A is a tree and that for every edge e = [u, z] of A (with o(e) = u, t(e) = z) such that u is closer to v than z we have [A_{z} : ω_{e}(A_{e})] = 1, that is A_{z} = ω_{e}(A_{e}).

An action of a group G on a tree X without edge-inversions is called trivial if there exists a vertex x of X that is fixed by G, that is such that Gx = x. It is known that an action of G on X is trivial if and only if the quotient graph of groups for that action is trivial.

Typically, only nontrivial actions on trees are studied in Bass–Serre theory since trivial graphs of groups do not carry any interesting algebraic information, although trivial actions in the above sense (e. g. actions of groups by automorphisms on rooted trees) may also be interesting for other mathematical reasons.

One of the classic and still important results of the theory is a theorem of Stallings about ends of groups. The theorem states that a finitely generated group has more than one end if and only if this group admits a nontrivial splitting over finite subgroups that is, if and only if the group admits a nontrivial action without inversions on a tree with finite edge stabilizers.

An important general result of the theory states that if G is a group with Kazhdan's property (T) then G does not admit any nontrivial splitting, that is, that any action of G on a tree X without edge-inversions has a global fixed vertex.

== Hyperbolic length functions ==
Let G be a group acting on a tree X without edge-inversions.

For every g∈G put

$$\ell_X(g)=\min\{ d(x,gx) | x\in VX\}.$$

Then ℓ_{X}(g) is called the translation length of g on X.

The function

$$\ell_X: G\to\mathbf{Z}, \quad g\in G\mapsto \ell_X(g)$$

is called the hyperbolic length function or the translation length function for the action of G on X.

=== Basic facts regarding hyperbolic length functions ===
- For g ∈ G exactly one of the following holds:

(a) ℓ_{X}(g) = 0 and g fixes a vertex of G. In this case g is called an elliptic element of G.
(b) ℓ_{X}(g) > 0 and there is a unique bi-infinite embedded line in X, called the axis of g and denoted L_{g} which is g-invariant. In this case g acts on L_{g} by translation of magnitude ℓ_{X}(g) and the element g ∈ G is called hyperbolic.

- If ℓ_{X}(G) ≠ 0 then there exists a unique minimal G-invariant subtree X_{G} of X. Moreover, X_{G} is equal to the union of axes of hyperbolic elements of G.

The length-function ℓ_{X} : G → Z is said to be abelian if it is a group homomorphism from G to Z and non-abelian otherwise. Similarly, the action of G on X is said to be abelian if the associated hyperbolic length function is abelian and is said to be non-abelian otherwise.

In general, an action of G on a tree X without edge-inversions is said to be minimal if there are no proper G-invariant subtrees in X.

An important fact in the theory says that minimal non-abelian tree actions are uniquely determined by their hyperbolic length functions:

=== Uniqueness theorem ===
Let G be a group with two nonabelian minimal actions without edge-inversions on trees X and Y. Suppose that the hyperbolic length functions ℓ_{X} and ℓ_{Y} on G are equal, that is ℓ_{X}(g) = ℓ_{Y}(g) for every g ∈ G. Then the actions of G on X and Y are equal in the sense that there exists a graph isomorphism f : X → Y which is G-equivariant, that is f(gx) = g f(x) for every g ∈ G and every x ∈ VX.

== Important developments in Bass–Serre theory ==
Important developments in Bass–Serre theory in the last 30 years include:

- Various accessibility results for finitely presented groups that bound the complexity (that is, the number of edges) in a graph of groups decomposition of a finitely presented group, where some algebraic or geometric restrictions on the types of groups considered are imposed. These results include:
  - Dunwoody's theorem about accessibility of finitely presented groups stating that for any finitely presented group G there exists a bound on the complexity of splittings of G over finite subgroups (the splittings are required to satisfy a technical assumption of being "reduced");
  - Bestvina–Feighn generalized accessibility theorem stating that for any finitely presented group G there is a bound on the complexity of reduced splittings of G over small subgroups (the class of small groups includes, in particular, all groups that do not contain non-abelian free subgroups);
  - Acylindrical accessibility results for finitely presented (Sela, Delzant) and finitely generated (Weidmann) groups which bound the complexity of the so-called acylindrical splittings, that is splittings where for their Bass–Serre covering trees the diameters of fixed subsets of nontrivial elements of G are uniformly bounded.
- The theory of JSJ-decompositions for finitely presented groups. This theory was motivated by the classic notion of JSJ decomposition in 3-manifold topology and was initiated, in the context of word-hyperbolic groups, by the work of Sela. JSJ decompositions are splittings of finitely presented groups over some classes of small subgroups (cyclic, abelian, noetherian, etc., depending on the version of the theory) that provide a canonical descriptions, in terms of some standard moves, of all splittings of the group over subgroups of the class. There are a number of versions of JSJ-decomposition theories:
  - The initial version of Sela for cyclic splittings of torsion-free word-hyperbolic groups.
  - Bowditch's version of JSJ theory for word-hyperbolic groups (with possible torsion) encoding their splittings over virtually cyclic subgroups.
  - The version of Rips and Sela of JSJ decompositions of torsion-free finitely presented groups encoding their splittings over free abelian subgroups.
  - The version of Dunwoody and Sageev of JSJ decompositions of finitely presented groups over noetherian subgroups.
  - The version of Fujiwara and Papasoglu, also of JSJ decompositions of finitely presented groups over noetherian subgroups.
  - A version of JSJ decomposition theory for finitely presented groups developed by Scott and Swarup.
- The theory of lattices in automorphism groups of trees. The theory of tree lattices was developed by Bass, Kulkarni and Lubotzky by analogy with the theory of lattices in Lie groups (that is discrete subgroups of Lie groups of finite co-volume). For a discrete subgroup G of the automorphism group of a locally finite tree X one can define a natural notion of volume for the quotient graph of groups A as

$$vol(\mathbf A)=\sum_{v\in V} \frac{1}{|A_v|}.$$

The group G is called an X-lattice if vol(A)< ∞. The theory of tree lattices turns out to be useful in the study of discrete subgroups of algebraic groups over non-archimedean local fields and in the study of Kac–Moody groups.

- Development of foldings and Nielsen methods for approximating group actions on trees and analyzing their subgroup structure.
- The theory of ends and relative ends of groups, particularly various generalizations of Stallings theorem about groups with more than one end.
- Quasi-isometric rigidity results for groups acting on trees.

== Generalizations ==
There have been several generalizations of Bass–Serre theory:

- The theory of complexes of groups (see Haefliger, Corson Bridson-Haefliger) provides a higher-dimensional generalization of Bass–Serre theory. The notion of a graph of groups is replaced by that of a complex of groups, where groups are assigned to each cell in a simplicial complex, together with monomorphisms between these groups corresponding to face inclusions (these monomorphisms are required to satisfy certain compatibility conditions). One can then define an analog of the fundamental group of a graph of groups for a complex of groups. However, in order for this notion to have good algebraic properties (such as embeddability of the vertex groups in it) and in order for a good analog for the notion of the Bass–Serre covering tree to exist in this context, one needs to require some sort of "non-positive curvature" condition for the complex of groups in question (see, for example).
- The theory of isometric group actions on real trees (or R-trees) which are metric spaces generalizing the graph-theoretic notion of a tree (graph theory). The theory was developed largely in the 1990s, where the Rips machine of Eliyahu Rips on the structure theory of stable group actions on R-trees played a key role (see Bestvina-Feighn). This structure theory assigns to a stable isometric action of a finitely generated group G a certain "normal form" approximation of that action by a stable action of G on a simplicial tree and hence a splitting of G in the sense of Bass–Serre theory. Group actions on real trees arise naturally in several contexts in geometric topology: for example as boundary points of the Teichmüller space (every point in the Thurston boundary of the Teichmüller space is represented by a measured geodesic lamination on the surface; this lamination lifts to the universal cover of the surface and a naturally dual object to that lift is an R-tree endowed with an isometric action of the fundamental group of the surface), as Gromov-Hausdorff limits of, appropriately rescaled, Kleinian group actions, and so on. The use of R-trees machinery provides substantial shortcuts in modern proofs of Thurston's Hyperbolization Theorem for Haken 3-manifolds. Similarly, R-trees play a key role in the study of Culler-Vogtmann's Outer space as well as in other areas of geometric group theory; for example, asymptotic cones of groups often have a tree-like structure and give rise to group actions on real trees. The use of R-trees, together with Bass–Serre theory, is a key tool in the work of Sela on solving the isomorphism problem for (torsion-free) word-hyperbolic groups, Sela's version of the JSJ-decomposition theory and the work of Sela on the Tarski Conjecture for free groups and the theory of limit groups.
- The theory of group actions on Λ-trees, where Λ is an ordered abelian group (such as R or Z) provides a further generalization of both the Bass–Serre theory and the theory of group actions on R-trees (see Morgan, Alperin-Bass, Chiswell).

== See also ==
- Geometric group theory
