= Martin Dunwoody =

British mathematician

Martin John Dunwoody (born 3 November 1938) is an emeritus professor of Mathematics at the University of Southampton, England.

He earned his PhD in 1964 from the Australian National University. He held positions at the University of Sussex before becoming a professor at the University of Southampton in 1992. He has been emeritus professor since 2003.

Dunwoody works on geometric group theory and low-dimensional topology. He is a leading expert in splittings and accessibility of discrete groups, groups acting on graphs and trees, JSJ-decompositions, the topology of 3-manifolds and the structure of their fundamental groups.

Since 1971 several mathematicians have been working on Wall's conjecture, posed by Wall in a 1971 paper, which said that all finitely generated groups are accessible. Roughly, this means that every finitely generated group can be constructed from finite and one-ended groups via a finite number of amalgamated free products and HNN extensions over finite subgroups. In view of the Stallings theorem about ends of groups, one-ended groups are precisely those finitely generated infinite groups that cannot be decomposed nontrivially as amalgamated products or HNN-extensions over finite subgroups. Dunwoody proved the Wall conjecture for finitely presented groups in 1985. In 1991 he finally disproved Wall's conjecture by finding a finitely generated group that is not accessible.

Dunwoody found a graph-theoretic proof of Stallings' theorem about ends of groups in 1982, by constructing certain tree-like automorphism invariant graph decompositions. This work has been developed to an important theory in the book Groups acting on graphs, Cambridge University Press, 1989, with Warren Dicks. In 2002 Dunwoody put forward a proposed proof of the Poincaré conjecture. The proof generated considerable interest among mathematicians, but a mistake was quickly discovered and the proof was withdrawn. The conjecture was later proven by Grigori Perelman, following the program of Richard S. Hamilton.
