= Normal closure (group theory) =

Smallest normal group containing a set

In group theory, the normal closure of a subset $S$ of a group $G$ is the smallest normal subgroup of $G$ containing $S.$

== Properties and description ==
Formally, if $G$ is a group and $S$ is a subset of $G,$ the normal closure $\operatorname{ncl}_G(S)$ of $S$ is the intersection of all normal subgroups of $G$ containing $S$:
$$\operatorname{ncl}_G(S) = \bigcap_{S \subseteq N \triangleleft G} N.$$

The normal closure $\operatorname{ncl}_G(S)$ is the smallest normal subgroup of $G$ containing $S,$ in the sense that $\operatorname{ncl}_G(S)$ is a subset of every normal subgroup of $G$ that contains $S.$

The subgroup $\operatorname{ncl}_G(S)$ is the subgroup generated by the set $S^G=\{s^g : s \in S, g\in G\} = \{g^{-1}sg : s \in S, g\in G\}$ of all conjugates of elements of $S$ in $G.$ Therefore, one can also write the subgroup as the set of all products of conjugates of elements of $S$ or their inverses:
$$\operatorname{ncl}_G(S) = \{g_1^{-1}s_1^{\epsilon_1} g_1\cdots g_n^{-1}s_n^{\epsilon_n}g_n : n \geq 0, \epsilon_i = \pm 1, s_i\in S, g_i \in G\}.$$

Any normal subgroup is equal to its normal closure. The normal closure of the empty set $\varnothing$ is the trivial subgroup.

A variety of other notations are used for the normal closure in the literature, including $\langle S^G\rangle,$ $\langle S\rangle^G,$ $\langle \langle S\rangle\rangle_G,$ and $\langle\langle S\rangle\rangle^G.$

Dual to the concept of normal closure is that of normal interior or normal core, defined as the join of all normal subgroups contained in $S.$

== Group presentations ==
For a group $G$ given by a presentation $G=\langle S \mid R\rangle$ with generators $S$ and defining relators $R,$ the presentation notation means that $G$ is the quotient group $G = F(S) / \operatorname{ncl}_{F(S)}(R),$ where $F(S)$ is a free group on $S.$
