= Normal form for free groups and free product of groups =

In mathematics, particularly in combinatorial group theory, a normal form for a free group over a set of generators or for a free product of groups is a representation of an element by a simpler element, the element being either in the free group or free products of group. In case of free group these simpler elements are reduced words and in the case of free product of groups these are reduced sequences. The precise definitions of these are given below. As it turns out, for a free group and for the free product of groups, there exists a unique normal form i.e each element is representable by a simpler element and this representation is unique. This is the Normal Form Theorem for the free groups and for the free product of groups. The proof here of the Normal Form Theorem follows the idea of Artin and van der Waerden.

== Normal Form for Free Groups ==
Let $G$ be a free group with generating set $S$. Each element in $G$ is represented by a word $w=a_1\cdots a_n,$ where $a_j\in S^{\pm}, 1\leqslant j\leqslant n.$

Definition. A word is called reduced if it contains no string of the form $aa^{-1}, a\in S^{\pm}.$

Definition. A normal form for a free group $G$ with generating set $S$ is a choice of a reduced word in $S$ for each element of $G$.

Normal Form Theorem for Free Groups. A free group has a unique normal form i.e. each element in $G$ is represented by a unique reduced word.

Proof. An elementary transformation of a word $w\in G$ consists of inserting or deleting a part of the form $aa^{-1}$ with $a\in S^{\pm}$. Two words $w_1$ and $w_2$ are equivalent, $w_1\equiv w_2$, if there is a chain of elementary transformations leading from $w_1$ to $w_2$. This is an equivalence relation on $G$. Let $G_0$ be the set of reduced words. We shall show that each equivalence class of words contains exactly one reduced word. It is clear that each equivalence class contains a reduced word, since successive deletion of parts $aa^{-1}$ from any word $w$ must lead to a reduced word. It will suffice then to show that distinct reduced words $u$ and $v$ are not equivalent. For each $x\in S$ define a permutation $x\Delta$ of $G_0$ by setting $w(x\Delta)=wx$ if $wx$ is reduced and $w(x\Delta)=u$ if $w=ux^{-1}$. Let $P$ be the group of permutations of $G_0$ generated by the $x\Delta, x\in S$. Let $\Delta^*$ be the multiplicative extension of $\Delta$ to a map $\Delta^*:W\mapsto P$. If $u_1\equiv u_2,$ then $u_1\Delta^*=u_2\Delta^*$; moreover $1(u\Delta^*) =u_0$ is reduced with $u_0\equiv u.$ It follows that if $u_1\equiv u_2$ with $u_1, u_2$ reduced, then $u_1=u_2$.

== Normal Form for Free Products ==
Let $G = A* B$ be the free product of groups $A$ and $B$. Every element $w\in G$ is represented by $w = g_1 \cdots g_n$ where $g_j\in A \text{ or } B$ for $1\leqslant j\leqslant n$.

Definition. A reduced sequence is a sequence $g_1, \cdots, g_n$ such that for $1\leqslant j\leqslant n$ we have $g_j \in A \text{ or } B, g_j \neq e$ and $g_j, g_{j+1}$ are not in the same factor $A$ or $B$. The identity element is represented by the empty set.

Definition. A normal form for a free product of groups is a representation or choice of a reduced sequence for each element in the free product.

Normal Form Theorem for Free Product of Groups. Consider the free product $A*B$ of two groups $A$ and $B$. Then the following two equivalent statements hold.

(1) If $w=g_1\cdots g_n, n>0$, where $g_1,\cdots, g_n$ is a reduced sequence, then $w\neq 1$ in $A*B.$
(2) Each element of $A*B$ can be written uniquely as $w=g_1\cdots g_n$ where $g_1,\cdots ,g_n$ is a reduced sequence.

=== Proof ===
==== Equivalence ====
The fact that the second statement implies the first is easy. Now suppose the first statement holds and let:

$$g_1 \cdots g_m = w = h_1 \cdots h_n.$$

This implies

$$h_n^{-1}\cdots h_1^{-1}g_1 \cdots g_m = 1.$$

Hence by first statement left hand side can be reduced. This can happen only if $h_1^{-1}g_1 =1,$ i.e. $g_1=h_1.$ Proceeding inductively we have $m = n$ and $g_i = h_i$ for all $1\leqslant i\leqslant n.$ This shows both statements are equivalent.

==== Proof of (2) ====
Let W be the set of all reduced sequences in A ∗ B and S(W) be its group of permutations. Define φ : A → S(W) as follows:

$$\varphi(a)(g_1,g_2,\cdots ,g_m) =
\begin{cases}
(g_1, g_2, \cdots, g_m) & \text{if } a = 1 \\
(a,g_1,g_2,\cdots ,g_m) & \text{if } g_1\in B  \\
(ag_1,g_2,\cdots ,g_m)  & \text{if } g_1\in A \text{ and }ag_1\neq 1  \\
(g_2,g_3,\cdots ,g_m) & \text{if } g_1\in A \text{ and } ag_1=1.
\end{cases}$$

Similarly we define ψ : B → S(W).

It is easy to check that φ and ψ are homomorphisms. Therefore by universal property of free product we will get a unique map φ ∗ ψ : A ∗ B → S(W) such that φ ∗ ψ (id)(1) = id(1) = 1.

Now suppose $w=g_1\cdots g_n, n>0,$ where $(g_1, \cdots, g_n)$ is a reduced sequence, then $\phi *\psi (w)(1)=(g_1,\cdots, g_n).$ Therefore w = 1 in A ∗ B which contradicts n > 0.
