= Monothetic group =

In mathematics, a monothetic group is a topological group with a dense cyclic subgroup. They were introduced by Van Dantzig (1933). An example is the additive group of p-adic integers, in which the integers are dense.

A monothetic group is necessarily abelian.
