= End (topology) =

In topology, a branch of mathematics, the ends of a topological space are, roughly speaking, the connected components of the "ideal boundary" of the space. That is, each end represents a topologically distinct way to move to infinity within the space. Adding a point at each end yields a compactification of the original space, known as the end compactification.

The notion of an end of a topological space was introduced by Hans Freudenthal (1931).

== Definition ==
Let $X$ be a topological space, and suppose that

$K_1 \subseteq K_2 \subseteq K_3 \subseteq \cdots$

is an ascending sequence of compact subsets of $X$ whose interiors cover $X$. Then $X$ has one end for every sequence

$U_1 \supseteq U_2 \supseteq U_3 \supseteq \cdots,$

where each $U_n$ is a connected component of $X\setminus K_n$. The number of ends does not depend on the specific sequence $(K_i)$ of compact sets; there is a natural bijection between the sets of ends associated with any two such sequences.

Using this definition, a neighborhood of an end $(U_i)$ is an open set $V$ such that $V\supset U_n$ for some $n$. Such neighborhoods represent the neighborhoods of the corresponding point at infinity in the end compactification (this "compactification" is not always compact; the topological space X has to be connected and locally connected).

The definition of ends given above applies only to spaces $X$ that possess an exhaustion by compact sets (that is, $X$ must be hemicompact). However, it can be generalized as follows: let $X$ be any topological space, and consider the direct system $\{K\}$ of compact subsets of $X$ and inclusion maps. There is a corresponding inverse system $\{\pi_0(X\setminus K)\}$, where $\pi_0(Y)$ denotes the set of connected components of a space $Y$, and each inclusion map $Z\to Y$ induces a function $\pi_0(Y)\to\pi_0(Z)$. Then the set of ends of $X$ is defined to be the inverse limit of this inverse system.

Under this definition, the set of ends is a functor from the category of topological spaces, where morphisms are only proper continuous maps, to the category of sets. Explicitly, if $\varphi:X\to Y$ is a proper map and $x=(x_K)_K$ is an end of $X$ (i.e. each element $x_K$ in the family is a connected component of $X\setminus K$ and they are compatible with maps induced by inclusions) then $\varphi(x)$ is the family $\varphi_*(x_{\varphi^{-1}(K')})$ where $K'$ ranges over compact subsets of Y and $\varphi_*$ is the map induced by $\varphi$ from $\pi_0(X \setminus \varphi^{-1}(K'))$ to $\pi_0(Y \setminus K')$. Properness of $\varphi$ is used to ensure that each $\varphi^{-1}(K')$ is compact in $X$.

The original definition above represents the special case where the direct system of compact subsets has a cofinal sequence.

== Examples ==
- The set of ends of any compact space is the empty set.
- The real line $\mathbb{R}$ has two ends. For example, if we let K_{n} be the closed interval [−n, n], then the two ends are the sequences of open sets U_{n} = (n, ∞) and V_{n} = (−∞, −n). These ends are usually referred to as "infinity" and "minus infinity", respectively.
- If n > 1, then Euclidean space $\mathbb{R}^n$ has only one end. This is because $\mathbb{R}^n \smallsetminus K$ has only one unbounded component for any compact set K.
- More generally, if M is a compact manifold with boundary, then the number of ends of the interior of M is equal to the number of connected components of the boundary of M.
- The union of n distinct rays emanating from the origin in $\mathbb{R}^2$ has n ends.
- The infinite complete binary tree has uncountably many ends, corresponding to the uncountably many different descending paths starting at the root. (This can be seen by letting K_{n} be the complete binary tree of depth n.) These ends can be thought of as the "leaves" of the infinite tree. In the end compactification, the set of ends has the topology of a Cantor set.

== Ends of graphs and groups ==
In infinite graph theory, an end is defined slightly differently, as an equivalence class of semi-infinite paths in the graph, or as a haven, a function mapping finite sets of vertices to connected components of their complements. However, for locally finite graphs (graphs in which each vertex has finite degree), the ends defined in this way correspond one-for-one with the ends of topological spaces defined from the graph (Diestel & Kühn 2003).

The ends of a finitely generated group are defined to be the ends of the corresponding Cayley graph; this definition is insensitive to the choice of generating set. Every finitely-generated infinite group has either 1, 2, or infinitely many ends, and Stallings theorem about ends of groups provides a decomposition for groups with more than one end.

== Ends of a CW complex ==
For a path connected CW-complex, the ends can be characterized as homotopy classes of proper maps $\mathbb{R}^+\to X$, called rays in X: more precisely, if between the restriction —to the subset $\mathbb{N}$— of any two of these maps exists a proper homotopy we say that they are equivalent and they define an equivalence class of proper rays. This set is called an end of X.
