= HNN extension =

Construction of combinatorial group theory

In mathematics, the HNN extension is an important construction of combinatorial group theory.

Introduced in a 1949 paper Embedding Theorems for Groups by Graham Higman, Bernhard Neumann, and Hanna Neumann, it embeds a given group G into another group G' , in such a way that two given isomorphic subgroups of G are conjugate (through a given isomorphism) in G' .

== Construction ==
Let G be a group with presentation $G = \langle S \mid R\rangle$, and let $\alpha\colon H \to K$ be an isomorphism between two subgroups of G. Let t be a new symbol not in S, and define

$$G*_{\alpha} = \left \langle S,t \mid R, tht^{-1}=\alpha(h), \forall h\in H \right \rangle.$$

The group $G*_{\alpha}$ is called the HNN extension of G relative to α. The original group G is called the base group for the construction, while the subgroups H and K are the associated subgroups. The new generator t is called the stable letter.

== Key properties ==
Since the presentation for $G*_{\alpha}$ contains all the generators and relations from the presentation for G, there is a natural homomorphism, induced by the identification of generators, which takes G to $G*_{\alpha}$. Higman, Neumann, and Neumann proved that this morphism is injective, that is, an embedding of G into $G*_{\alpha}$. A consequence is that two isomorphic subgroups of a given group are always conjugate in some overgroup; the desire to show this was the original motivation for the construction.

=== Britton's Lemma ===
A key property of HNN-extensions is a normal form theorem known as Britton's Lemma. Let $G*_{\alpha}$ be as above and let w be the following product in $G*_{\alpha}$:

$$w=g_0 t^{\varepsilon_1} g_1 t^{\varepsilon_2} \cdots g_{n-1} t^{\varepsilon_n}g_n, \qquad g_i \in G, \varepsilon_i = \pm 1.$$

Then Britton's Lemma can be stated as follows:

Britton's Lemma. If w = 1 in G∗_{α} then

- either $n = 0$ and g_{0} = 1 in G
- or $n > 0$ and for some i ∈ {1, ..., n−1} one of the following holds:
1. ε_{i} = 1, ε_{i+1} = −1, g_{i} ∈ H,
2. ε_{i} = −1, ε_{i+1} = 1, g_{i} ∈ K.

In contrapositive terms, Britton's Lemma takes the following form:

Britton's Lemma (alternate form). If w is such that

- either $n = 0$ and g_{0} ≠ 1 ∈ G,
- or $n > 0$ and the product w does not contain substrings of the form tht^{−1}, where h ∈ H and of the form t^{−1}kt where k ∈ K,

then $w\ne 1$ in $G*_{\alpha}$.

=== Consequences of Britton's Lemma ===
Most basic properties of HNN-extensions follow from Britton's Lemma. These consequences include the following facts:

- The natural homomorphism from G to $G*_{\alpha}$ is injective, so that we can think of $G*_{\alpha}$ as containing G as a subgroup.
- Every element of finite order in $G*_{\alpha}$ is conjugate to an element of G.
- Every finite subgroup of $G*_{\alpha}$ is conjugate to a finite subgroup of G.
- If $G$ contains an element $g$ such that $g^k$ is contained in neither $H$ nor $K$ for any integer $k$, then $G*_{\alpha}$ contains a subgroup isomorphic to a free group of rank two.

== Applications and generalizations ==
Applied to algebraic topology, the HNN extension constructs the fundamental group of a topological space X that has been 'glued back' on itself by a mapping f : X → X (see e.g. Surface bundle over the circle). Thus, HNN extensions describe the fundamental group of a self-glued space in the same way that free products with amalgamation do for two spaces X and Y glued along a connected common subspace, as in the Seifert-van Kampen theorem. The HNN extension is a natural analogue of the amalgamated free product, and comes up in determining the fundamental group of a union when the intersection is not connected. These two constructions allow the description of the fundamental group of any reasonable geometric gluing. This is generalized into the Bass–Serre theory of groups acting on trees, constructing fundamental groups of graphs of groups.

HNN-extensions play a key role in Higman's proof of the Higman embedding theorem which states that every finitely generated recursively presented group can be homomorphically embedded in a finitely presented group. Most modern proofs of the Novikov–Boone theorem about the existence of a finitely presented group with algorithmically undecidable word problem also substantially use HNN-extensions.

The idea of HNN extension has been extended to other parts of abstract algebra, including Lie algebra theory.

== See also ==
- Group extension
