= Word (group theory) =

In group theory, a word is any written product of group elements and their inverses. For example, if x, y and z are elements of a group G, then xy, z^{−1}xzz and y^{−1}zxx^{−1}yz^{−1} are words in the set {x, y, z}. Two different words may evaluate to the same value in G, or even in every group. Words play an important role in the theory of free groups and presentations, and are central objects of study in combinatorial group theory.

== Definitions ==
Let G be a group, and let S be a subset of G. A word in S is any expression of the form

$$s_1^{\varepsilon_1} s_2^{\varepsilon_2} \cdots s_n^{\varepsilon_n}$$

where s_{1},...,s_{n} are elements of S, called generators, and each ε_{i} is ±1. The number n is known as the length of the word.

Each word in S represents an element of G, namely the product of the expression. By convention, the unique identity element can be represented by the empty word, which is the unique word of length zero.

== Notation ==
When writing words, it is common to use exponential notation as an abbreviation. For example, the word

$$x x y^{-1} z y z z z x^{-1} x^{-1} \,$$

could be written as

$$x^2 y^{-1} z y z^3 x^{-2}. \,$$

This latter expression is not a word itself—it is simply a shorter notation for the original.

When dealing with long words, it can be helpful to use an overline to denote inverses of elements of S. Using overline notation, the above word would be written as follows:

$$x^2\overline{y}zyz^3\overline{x}^2. \,$$

== Reduced words ==
Any word in which a generator appears next to its own inverse (xx^{−1} or x^{−1}x) can be simplified by omitting the redundant pair:

$$y^{-1}zxx^{-1}y\;\;\longrightarrow\;\;y^{-1}zy.$$

This operation is known as reduction, and it does not change the group element represented by the word. Reductions can be thought of as relations (defined below) that follow from the group axioms.

A reduced word is a word that contains no redundant pairs. Any word can be simplified to a reduced word by performing a sequence of reductions:

$$xzy^{-1}xx^{-1}yz^{-1}zz^{-1}yz\;\;\longrightarrow\;\;xyz.$$

The result does not depend on the order in which the reductions are performed.

A word is cyclically reduced if and only if every cyclic permutation of the word is reduced.

== Operations on words ==
The product of two words is obtained by concatenation:

$$\left(xzyz^{-1}\right)\left(zy^{-1}x^{-1}y\right) = xzyz^{-1}zy^{-1}x^{-1}y.$$

Even if the two words are reduced, the product may not be.

The inverse of a word is obtained by inverting each generator, and reversing the order of the elements:

$$\left(zy^{-1}x^{-1}y\right)^{-1}=y^{-1}xyz^{-1}.$$

The product of a word with its inverse can be reduced to the empty word:

$$zy^{-1}x^{-1}y \; y^{-1}xyz^{-1} = 1.$$

You can move a generator from the beginning to the end of a word by conjugation:

$$x^{-1}\left(xy^{-1}z^{-1}yz\right)x = y^{-1}z^{-1}yzx.$$

== Generating set of a group ==
A subset S of a group G is called a generating set if every element of G can be represented by a word in S.

When S is not a generating set for G, the set of elements represented by words in S is a subgroup of G, known as the subgroup of G generated by S and usually denoted $\langle S\rangle$. It is the smallest subgroup of G that contains the elements of S.

== Normal forms ==
A normal form for a group G with generating set S is a choice of one reduced word in S for each element of G. For example:

- The words 1, i, j, ij are a normal form for the Klein four-group with S = {i, j} and 1 representing the empty word (the identity element for the group).
- The words 1, r, r^{2}, ..., r^{n-1}, s, sr, ..., sr^{n-1} are a normal form for the dihedral group Dih_{n} with S = {s, r} and 1 as above.
- The set of words of the form x^{m}y^{n} for m,n ∈ Z are a normal form for the direct product of the cyclic groups ⟨x⟩ and ⟨y⟩ with S = {x, y}.
- The set of reduced words in S are the unique normal form for the free group over S.

== Relations and presentations ==
If S is a generating set for a group G, a relation is a pair of words in S that represent the same element of G. These are usually written as equations, e.g. $x^{-1} y x = y^2.\,$ A set $\mathcal{R}$ of relations defines G if every relation in G follows logically from those in $\mathcal{R}$ using the axioms for a group. A presentation for G is a pair $\langle S \mid \mathcal{R}\rangle$, where S is a generating set for G and $\mathcal{R}$ is a defining set of relations.

For example, the Klein four-group can be defined by the presentation

$$\langle i,j \mid i^2 = 1,\,j^2 = 1,\,ij=ji\rangle.$$

Here 1 denotes the empty word, which represents the identity element.

== Free groups ==
If S is any set, the free group over S is the group with presentation $\langle S\mid\;\rangle$. That is, the free group over S is the group generated by the elements of S, with no extra relations. Every element of the free group can be written uniquely as a reduced word in S.

== See also ==
- Word problem (mathematics)
- Word problem for groups
