= Graph of groups =

In geometric group theory, a graph of groups is an object consisting of a collection of groups indexed by the vertices and edges of a graph, together with a family of monomorphisms of the edge groups into the vertex groups. There is a unique group, called the fundamental group, canonically associated to each finite connected graph of groups. It admits an orientation-preserving action on a tree: the original graph of groups can be recovered from the quotient graph and the stabilizer subgroups. This theory, commonly referred to as Bass–Serre theory, is due to the work of Hyman Bass and Jean-Pierre Serre.

== Definition ==
A graph of groups over a graph Y is an assignment to each vertex x of Y of a group G_{x} and to each edge y of Y of a group G_{y} as well as monomorphisms φ_{y,0} and φ_{y,1} mapping G_{y} into the groups assigned to the vertices at its ends.

== Fundamental group ==
Let T be a spanning tree for Y and define the fundamental group Γ to be the group generated by the vertex groups G_{x} and elements y for each edge of Y with the following relations:

- y̅ = y^{−1} if y̅ is the edge y with the reverse orientation.
- y φ_{y,0}(x) y^{−1} = φ_{y,1}(x) for all x in G_{y}.
- y = 1 if y is an edge in T.

This definition is independent of the choice of T.

The benefit in defining the fundamental groupoid of a graph of groups, as shown by Higgins (1976), is that it is defined independently of base point or tree. In the 1976 Higgins paper, there is also a proof establishing a normal form for the elements of the fundamental groupoid. This includes normal form theorems for a free product with amalgamation and for an HNN extension (Bass 1993).

== Structure theorem ==
Let Γ be the fundamental group corresponding to the spanning tree T. For every vertex x and edge y, G_{x} and G_{y} can be identified with their images in Γ. It is possible to define a graph with vertices and edges the disjoint union of all coset spaces Γ/G_{x} and Γ/G_{y} respectively. This graph is a tree, called the universal covering tree, on which Γ acts. It admits the graph Y as fundamental domain. The graph of groups given by the stabilizer subgroups on the fundamental domain corresponds to the original graph of groups.

== Examples ==
- A graph of groups on a graph with one edge and two vertices corresponds to a free product with amalgamation.
- A graph of groups on a single vertex with a loop corresponds to an HNN extension.

== Generalisations ==
The simplest possible generalisation of a graph of groups is a 2-dimensional complex of groups. These are modeled on orbifolds arising from cocompact properly discontinuous actions of discrete groups on 2-dimensional simplicial complexes that have the structure of CAT(0) spaces. The quotient of the simplicial complex has finite stabilizer groups attached to vertices, edges and triangles together with monomorphisms for every inclusion of simplices. A complex of groups is said to be developable if it arises as the quotient of a CAT(0) simplicial complex. Developability is a non-positive curvature condition on the complex of groups: it can be verified locally by checking that all circuits occurring in the link of vertices have length at least six. Such complexes of groups originally arose in the theory of 2-dimensional Bruhat–Tits buildings; their general definition and continued study have been inspired by the ideas of Gromov.

== See also ==
- Bass–Serre theory
- Right-angled Artin group
