= Free group =

Mathematics concept

Diagram showing the Cayley graph for the free group on two generators. Each vertex represents an element of the free group, and each edge represents multiplication by a or b.

In mathematics, the free group $F_S$ over a given set $S$ consists of all words that can be built from members of $S$, considering two words to be different unless their equality follows from the group axioms (e.g. $st=suu^{-1}t$ but $s\neq t^{-1}$ for $s,t,u\in S$). The members of $S$ are called generators of $F_S$, and the number of generators is the rank of the free group. An arbitrary group $G$ is called free if it is isomorphic to $F_S$ for some subset $S$ of $G$, that is, if there is a subset $S$ of $G$ such that every element of $G$ can be written in exactly one way as a product of finitely many elements of $S$ and their inverses (disregarding trivial variations such as $st=suu^{-1}t$).

A related but different notion is a free abelian group; both notions are particular instances of a free object from universal algebra. As such, free groups are defined by their universal property.

== History ==
Free groups first arose in the study of hyperbolic geometry, as examples of Fuchsian groups (discrete groups acting by isometries on the hyperbolic plane). In an 1882 paper, Walther von Dyck pointed out that these groups have the simplest possible presentations. The algebraic study of free groups was initiated by Jakob Nielsen in 1924, who gave them their name and established many of their basic properties. Max Dehn realized the connection with topology, and obtained the first proof of the full Nielsen–Schreier theorem. Otto Schreier published an algebraic proof of this result in 1927, and Kurt Reidemeister included a comprehensive treatment of free groups in his 1932 book on combinatorial topology. Later on in the 1930s, Wilhelm Magnus discovered the connection between the lower central series of free groups and free Lie algebras.

== Examples ==
The group $(\mathbb{Z},+)$ of integers is free of rank 1; a generating set is $S=\{1\}$. The integers are also a free abelian group, although all free groups of rank $\geq 2$ are non-abelian. A free group on a two-element set $S$ occurs in the proof of the Banach–Tarski paradox and is described there.

On the other hand, any nontrivial finite group cannot be free, since the elements of a free generating set of a free group have infinite order.

In algebraic topology, the fundamental group of a bouquet of k circles (a set of k loops having only one point in common) is the free group on a set of k elements.

== Construction ==
The free group $F_S$ with free generating set $S$ can be constructed as follows. $S$ is a set of symbols, and we suppose for every $s$ in $S$ there is a corresponding "inverse" symbol, $s^{-1}$, in a set $S^{-1}$. Let $T=S\cup S^{-1}$, and define a word in $S$ to be any written product of elements of $T$. That is, a word in $S$ is an element of the monoid generated by $T$. The empty word is the word with no symbols at all. For example, if $S=\{a,b,c\}$, then $T=\{a,a^{-1},b,b^{-1},c,c^{-1}\}$, and
$$a b^3 c^{-1} c a^{-1} c\,$$
is a word in $F_S$.

If an element of $S$ lies immediately next to its inverse, the word may be simplified by omitting the $c,c^{-1}$ pair:
$$a b^3 c^{-1} c a^{-1} c\;\;\longrightarrow\;\;a b^3 \, a^{-1} c.$$
A word that cannot be simplified further is called reduced.

The free group $F_S$ is defined to be the group of all reduced words in $S$, with concatenation of words (followed by reduction if necessary) as group operation. The identity is the empty word.

A reduced word is called cyclically reduced if its first and last letter are not inverse to each other. Every word is conjugate to a cyclically reduced word, and a cyclically reduced conjugate of a cyclically reduced word is a cyclic permutation of the letters in the word. For instance $b^{-1}abcb$ is not cyclically reduced, but is conjugate to $abc$, which is cyclically reduced. The only cyclically reduced conjugates of $abc$ are $abc$, $bca$, and $cab$.

== Universal property ==
The free group $F_S$ is the universal group generated by the set $S$. This can be formalized by the following universal property: given any function $f$ from $S$ to a group $G$, there exists a unique homomorphism $\varphi:F_S\to G$ making the following diagram commute (where the unnamed mapping denotes the inclusion from $S$ into $F_S$):

That is, homomorphisms $F_S\to G$ are in one-to-one correspondence with functions $S\to G$. For a non-free group, the presence of relations would restrict the possible images of the generators under a homomorphism.

To see how this relates to the constructive definition, think of the mapping from $S$ to $F_S$ as sending each symbol to a word consisting of that symbol. To construct $\varphi$ for the given $f$, first note that $\varphi$ sends the empty word to the identity of $G$ and it has to agree with $f$ on the elements of $S$. For the remaining words (consisting of more than one symbol), $\varphi$ can be uniquely extended, since it is a homomorphism, i.e., $\varphi(ab)=\varphi(a)\varphi(b)$.

The above property characterizes free groups up to isomorphism, and is sometimes used as an alternative definition. It is known as the universal property of free groups, and the generating set $S$ is called a basis for $F_S$. The basis for a free group is not uniquely determined.

Being characterized by a universal property is the standard feature of free objects in universal algebra. In the language of category theory, the construction of the free group (similar to most constructions of free objects) is a functor from the category of sets to the category of groups. This functor is left adjoint to the forgetful functor from groups to sets.

== Facts and theorems ==
Some properties of free groups follow readily from the definition:

1. Any group $G$ is the homomorphic image of some free group $F_S$. Let $S$ be a set of generators of $G$. The natural map $\varphi$: $F_S\to G$ is an epimorphism, which proves the claim. Equivalently, $G$ is isomorphic to a quotient group of some free group $F_S$. If $S$ can be chosen to be finite here, then $G$ is called finitely generated. The kernel $\ker\varphi$ is the set of all relations in the presentation of $G$; if $\ker\varphi$ can be generated by the conjugates of finitely many elements of $F$, then $G$ is finitely presented.
2. If $S$ has more than one element, then $F_S$ is not abelian, and in fact the center of $F_S$ is trivial (that is, consists only of the identity element).
3. Two free groups $F_S$ and $F_T$ are isomorphic if and only if $S$ and $T$ have the same cardinality. This cardinality is called the rank of the free group $F$. Thus for every cardinal number k, there is, up to isomorphism, exactly one free group of rank k.
4. A free group of finite rank n > 1 has an exponential growth rate of order 2n − 1.

A few other related results are:

1. The Nielsen–Schreier theorem: Every subgroup of a free group is free. Furthermore, if the free group $F$ has rank n and the subgroup $H$ has index e in $F$, then $H$ is free of rank 1 + e(n–1).
2. A free group of rank k clearly has subgroups of every rank less than k. Less obviously, a (nonabelian!) free group of rank at least 2 has subgroups of all countable ranks.
3. The commutator subgroup of a free group of rank k > 1 has infinite rank; for example for $F(a,b)$, it is freely generated by the commutators $[a^m,b^n]$ for non-zero m and n.
4. The free group in two elements is SQ universal; the above follows as any SQ universal group has subgroups of all countable ranks.
5. Any group that acts on a tree, freely and preserving the orientation, is a free group of countable rank (given by 1 plus the Euler characteristic of the quotient graph).
6. The Cayley graph of a free group of finite rank, with respect to a free generating set, is a tree on which the group acts freely, preserving the orientation. As a topological space (a one-dimensional simplicial complex), this Cayley graph $\Gamma(F)$ is contractible. For a finitely presented group $G$, the natural homomorphism defined above, $\varphi:F\to G$, defines a covering map of Cayley graphs $\varphi^*:\Gamma(F)\to\Gamma(G)$, in fact a universal covering. Hence, the fundamental group of the Cayley graph $\Gamma(G)$ is isomorphic to the kernel of $\varphi$, the normal subgroup of relations among the generators of $G$. The extreme case is when $G=\{e\}$, the trivial group, considered with as many generators as $F$, all of them trivial; the Cayley graph $\Gamma(G)$ is a bouquet of circles, and its fundamental group is $F$ itself.
7. Any subgroup of a free group, $H \subset F$, corresponds to a covering space of the bouquet of circles, namely to the Schreier coset graph of $F/H$. This can be used to give a topological proof of the Nielsen-Schreier theorem above.
8. The groupoid approach to these results, given in the work by P.J. Higgins below, is related to the use of covering spaces above. It allows more powerful results, for example on Grushko's theorem, and a normal form for the fundamental groupoid of a graph of groups. In this approach there is considerable use of free groupoids on a directed graph.
9. Grushko's theorem has the consequence that if a subset $B$ of a free group $F$ on n elements generates $F$ and has n elements, then $B$ generates $F$ freely.

== Free abelian group ==
The free abelian group on a set $S$ is defined via its universal property in the analogous way, with obvious modifications: Consider a pair $(F,\varphi)$, where $F$ is an abelian group and $\varphi:S\to F$ is a function. $F$ is said to be the free abelian group on $S$ with respect to $\varphi$ if for any abelian group $G$ and any function $\psi:S\to G$, there exists a unique homomorphism $f:F\to G$ such that
$$f(\varphi(s))=\psi(s),\ \forall s\in S.$$

The free abelian group on $S$ can be explicitly identified as the free group $F(S)$ modulo the subgroup generated by its commutators, $[F(S),F(S)]$, i.e. its abelianisation. In other words, the free abelian group on $S$ is the set of words that are distinguished only up to the order of letters. The rank of a free group can therefore also be defined as the rank of its abelianisation as a free abelian group.

== Tarski's problems ==
Around 1945, Alfred Tarski asked whether the free groups on two or more generators have the same first-order theory, and whether this theory is decidable. Sela (2006) answered the first question by showing that any two nonabelian free groups have the same first-order theory, and Kharlampovich & Myasnikov (2006) answered both questions, showing that this theory is decidable.

A similar unsolved (as of 2011) question in free probability theory asks whether the von Neumann group algebras of any two non-abelian finitely generated free groups are isomorphic.

== See also ==
- Generating set of a group
- Presentation of a group
- Nielsen transformation, a factorization of elements of the automorphism group of a free group
- Normal form for free groups and free product of groups
- Free product
