= Presentation of a group =

Specification of a mathematical group by generators and relations

In mathematics, a presentation is one method of specifying a group. A presentation of a group G comprises a set S of generators—so that every element of the group can be written as a product of powers of some of these generators—and a set R of relations among those generators. We then say G has presentation

$$\langle S \mid R\rangle.$$

Informally, G has the above presentation if it is the "freest group" generated by S subject only to the relations R. Formally, the group G is said to have the above presentation if it is isomorphic to the quotient of a free group on S by the normal subgroup generated by the relations R.

As a simple example, the cyclic group of order n has the presentation

$$\langle a \mid a^n = 1\rangle,$$

where 1 is the group identity. This may be written equivalently as

$$\langle a \mid a^n\rangle,$$

thanks to the convention that terms that do not include an equals sign are taken to be equal to the group identity. Such terms are called relators, distinguishing them from the relations that do include an equals sign.

Every group has a presentation, and in fact many different presentations; a presentation is often the most compact way of describing the structure of the group.

A closely related but different concept is that of an absolute presentation of a group.

== Background ==
A free group on a set S is a group where each element can be uniquely described as a finite length product of the form:

$$s_1^{a_1} s_2^{a_2} \cdots s_n^{a_n}$$

where the s_{i} are elements of S, adjacent s_{i} are distinct, and a_{i} are non-zero integers (but n may be zero). In less formal terms, the group consists of words in the generators and their inverses, subject only to cancelling a generator with an adjacent occurrence of its inverse.

If G is any group, and S is a generating subset of G, then every element of G is also of the above form; but in general, these products will not uniquely describe an element of G.

For example, the dihedral group D_{8} of order sixteen can be generated by a rotation r of order 8 and a flip f of order 2, and certainly any element of D_{8} is a product of rs and fs.

However, we have, for example, rfr = f^{−1}, r^{7} = r^{−1}, etc., so such products are not unique in D_{8}. Each such product equivalence can be expressed as an equality to the identity, such as

rfrf = 1,
r^{8} = 1, or
f^{2} = 1.

Informally, we can consider these products on the left hand side as being elements of the free group F = ⟨r, f ⟩, and let R = ⟨rfrf, r^{8}, f^{2}⟩. That is, we let R be the subgroup generated by the strings rfrf, r^{8}, f^{2}, each of which is also equivalent to 1 when considered as products in D_{8}.

If we then let N be the subgroup of F generated by all conjugates x^{−1}Rx of R, then it follows by definition that every element of N is a finite product x_{1}^{−1}r_{1}x_{1} ... x_{m}^{−1}r_{m} x_{m} of members of such conjugates. It follows that each element of N, when considered as a product in D_{8}, will also evaluate to 1; and thus that N is a normal subgroup of F. Thus D_{8} is isomorphic to the quotient group F/N. We then say that D_{8} has presentation

$$\langle r, f \mid r^8 = 1, f^2 = 1, (rf)^2 = 1\rangle.$$

Here the set of generators is S = {r, f }, and the set of relations is R = {r ^{8} = 1, f ^{2} = 1, (rf )^{2} = 1}. We often see R abbreviated, giving the presentation

$$\langle r, f \mid r^8 = f^2 = (rf)^2 = 1\rangle.$$

An even shorter form drops the equality and identity signs, to list just the set of relators, which is {r ^{8}, f ^{2}, (rf )^{2}}. Doing this gives the presentation

$$\langle r, f \mid r^8, f^2, (rf)^2 \rangle.$$

All three presentations are equivalent.

== Notation ==
Although the notation ⟨S | R⟩ used in this article for a presentation is now the most common, earlier writers used different variations on the same format. Such notations include the following:

- ⟨S | R⟩
- (S | R)
- {S; R}
- ⟨S; R⟩

== Definition ==
Let S be a set and let F_{S} be the free group on S. Let R be a set of words on S, so R naturally gives a subset of $F_S$. To form a group with presentation $\langle S \mid R\rangle$, take the quotient of $F_S$ by the smallest normal subgroup that contains each element of R. (This subgroup is called the normal closure N of R in $F_S$.) The group $\langle S \mid R\rangle$ is then defined as the quotient group

$$\langle S \mid R \rangle = F_S / N.$$

The elements of S are called the generators of $\langle S \mid R\rangle$ and the elements of R are called the relators. A group G is said to have the presentation $\langle S \mid R\rangle$ if G is isomorphic to $\langle S \mid R\rangle$.

It is a common practice to write relators in the form $x = y$ where x and y are words on S. What this means is that $y^{-1}x\in R$. This has the intuitive meaning that the images of x and y are supposed to be equal in the quotient group. Thus, for example, r^{n} in the list of relators is equivalent with $r^n=1$.

For a finite group G, it is possible to build a presentation of G from the group multiplication table, as follows. Take S to be the set elements $g_i$ of G and R to be all words of the form $g_ig_jg_k^{-1}$, where $g_ig_j=g_k$ is an entry in the multiplication table.

=== Alternate definition ===
The definition of group presentation may alternatively be recast in terms of equivalence classes of words on the alphabet $S \cup S^{-1}$. In this perspective, we declare two words to be equivalent if it is possible to get from one to the other by a sequence of moves, where each move consists of adding or removing a consecutive pair $x x^{-1}$ or $x^{-1} x$ for some x in S, or by adding or removing a consecutive copy of a relator. The group elements are the equivalence classes, and the group operation is concatenation.

This point of view is particularly common in the field of combinatorial group theory.

== Finitely presented groups ==
A presentation is said to be finitely generated if S is finite and finitely related if R is finite. If both are finite it is said to be a finite presentation. A group is finitely generated (respectively finitely related, finitely presented) if it has a presentation that is finitely generated (respectively finitely related, a finite presentation). A group which has a finite presentation with a single relation is called a one-relator group.

== Recursively presented groups ==
If S is indexed by a set I consisting of all the natural numbers N or a finite subset of them, then it is easy to set up a simple one to one coding (or Gödel numbering) f : F_{S} → N from the free group on S to the natural numbers, such that we can find algorithms that, given f(w), calculate w, and vice versa. We can then call a subset U of F_{S} recursive (respectively recursively enumerable) if f(U) is recursive (respectively recursively enumerable). If S is indexed as above and R recursively enumerable, then the presentation is a recursive presentation and the corresponding group is recursively presented. This usage may seem odd, but it is possible to prove that if a group has a presentation with R recursively enumerable then it has another one with R recursive.

Every finitely presented group is recursively presented, but there are recursively presented groups that cannot be finitely presented. However a theorem of Graham Higman states that a finitely generated group has a recursive presentation if and only if it can be embedded in a finitely presented group. From this we can deduce that there are (up to isomorphism) only countably many finitely generated recursively presented groups. Bernhard Neumann has shown that there are uncountably many non-isomorphic two generator groups. Therefore, there are finitely generated groups that cannot be recursively presented.

== History ==
One of the earliest presentations of a group by generators and relations was given by the Irish mathematician William Rowan Hamilton in 1856, in his icosian calculus – a presentation of the icosahedral group. The first systematic study was given by Walther von Dyck, student of Felix Klein, in the early 1880s, laying the foundations for combinatorial group theory.

== Examples ==
The following table lists some examples of presentations for commonly studied groups. Note that in each case there are many other presentations that are possible. The presentation listed is not necessarily the most efficient one possible.

Group	Presentation	Comments
the free group on a set S	$\langle S \mid \varnothing \rangle$	A free group is "free" in the sense that it is subject to no relations.
$\pi_1(S_g)$, the fundamental group of an orientable genus $g\ge 0$ surface	$\left\langle a_1, b_1,\ldots, a_g, b_g | [a_1, b_1][a_2, b_2]\ldots [a_g, b_g] \right\rangle$	The bracket stands for the commutator: $[a, b] = aba^{-1}b^{-1}$
C_{n}, the cyclic group of order n	$\langle a \mid a^n \rangle$	
D_{n}, the dihedral group of order 2n	$\langle r,f \mid r^n , f^2 , (rf)^2 \rangle$	Here r represents a rotation and f a reflection.
D_{∞}, the infinite dihedral group	$\langle r,f \mid f^2, (rf)^2 \rangle$	
Dic_{n}, the dicyclic group of order 4n	$\langle r,f \mid r^{2n}, r^n=f^2, frf^{-1}=r^{-1} \rangle$	The quaternion group Q_{8} is a special case when n = 2
Z × Z	$\langle x,y \mid xy = yx \rangle$	
Z/mZ × Z/nZ	$\langle x,y \mid x^m, y^n, xy=yx \rangle$	
the free abelian group on a set S	$\langle S \mid R \rangle$ where R is the set of all commutators of elements of S	Isomorphic to a direct sum of |S| copies of Z.
S_{n}, the symmetric group on n symbols	generators: $\sigma_1, \ldots, \sigma_{n-1}$ relations: $\sigma_i^2 = 1$, $\sigma_i\sigma_j = \sigma_j\sigma_i \mbox{ if } j \neq i\pm 1$, $\sigma_i\sigma_{i+1}\sigma_i = \sigma_{i+1}\sigma_i\sigma_{i+1}$; The last set of relations can be transformed into: ${(\sigma_i\sigma_{i+1}})^3=1\$; using $\sigma_i^2=1$.	Here σ_{i} is the permutation that swaps the ith element with the i+1st one. The product σ_{i}σ_{i+1} is a 3-cycle on the set {i, i+1, i+2}.
B_{n}, the braid groups	generators: $\sigma_1, \ldots, \sigma_{n-1}$ relations: $\sigma_i\sigma_j = \sigma_j\sigma_i \mbox{ if } j \neq i\pm 1$, $\sigma_i\sigma_{i+1}\sigma_i = \sigma_{i+1}\sigma_i\sigma_{i+1}\$	Note the similarity with the symmetric group; the only difference is the removal of the relation $\sigma_i^2 = 1$.
V_{4} ≅ D_{2}, the Klein 4 group	$\langle s,t \mid s^2, t^2, (st)^2 \rangle$	
T ≅ A_{4}, the tetrahedral group	$\langle s,t \mid s^2, t^3, (st)^3 \rangle$	
O ≅ S_{4}, the octahedral group	$\langle s,t \mid s^2, t^3, (st)^4 \rangle$	
I ≅ A_{5}, the icosahedral group	$\langle s,t \mid s^2, t^3, (st)^5 \rangle$	
Q_{8}, the quaternion group	$\langle i,j \mid i^4, jij = i, iji = j \rangle\,$	For an alternative presentation see Dic_{n} above with n = 2.
SL(2, Z), the special linear group of degree 2 over Z	$\langle a,b \mid aba=bab, (aba)^4 \rangle$	topologically a and b can be visualized as Dehn twists on the torus
GL(2, Z), the general linear group of degree 2 over Z	$\langle a,b,j \mid aba=bab, (aba)^4,j^2,(ja)^2,(jb)^2 \rangle$	nontrivial Z/2Z – group extension of SL(2, Z)
PSL(2, Z), the modular group	$\langle a,b \mid a^2, b^3 \rangle$	PSL(2, Z) is the free product of the cyclic groups Z/2Z and Z/3Z
Heisenberg group	$\langle x,y,z \mid z=xyx^{-1}y^{-1}, xz=zx, yz=zy \rangle$	
BS(m, n), the Baumslag–Solitar groups	$\langle a, b \mid a^n = b a^m b^{-1} \rangle$	
Tits group	$\langle a, b \mid a^2, b^3, (ab)^{13}, [a, b]^5, [a, bab]^4, ((ab)^4 ab^{-1})^6 \rangle$	[a, b] is the commutator

An example of a finitely generated group that is not finitely presented is the wreath product $\mathbf{Z} \wr \mathbf{Z}$ of the group of integers with itself.

== Some theorems ==
Theorem. Every group has a presentation.

To see this, given a group G, consider the free group F_{G} on G. By the universal property of free groups, there exists a unique group homomorphism φ : F_{G} → G whose restriction to G is the identity map. Let K be the kernel of this homomorphism. Then K is normal in F_{G}, therefore is equal to its normal closure, so ⟨G | K⟩ = F_{G}/K. Since the identity map is surjective, φ is also surjective, so by the First Isomorphism Theorem, ⟨G | K⟩ ≅ im(φ) = G. This presentation may be highly inefficient if both G and K are much larger than necessary.

Corollary. Every finite group has a finite presentation.

One may take the elements of the group for generators and the Cayley table for relations.

=== Novikov–Boone theorem ===
The negative solution to the word problem for groups states that there is a finite presentation ⟨S | R⟩ for which there is no algorithm which, given two words u, v, decides whether u and v describe the same element in the group. This was shown by Pyotr Novikov in 1955 and a different proof was obtained by William Boone in 1958.

== Constructions ==
Suppose G has presentation ⟨S | R⟩ and H has presentation ⟨T | Q⟩ with S and T being disjoint. Then

- the free product G ∗ H has presentation ⟨S, T | R, Q⟩;
- the direct product G × H has presentation ⟨S, T | R, Q, [S, T]⟩, where [S, T] means that every element from S commutes with every element from T (cf. commutator); and
- the semidirect product G ⋊_{φ} H has presentation ⟨S, T | R, Q, {t s t^{−1} φ_{t}(s)^{−1} | s in S, t in T}⟩.

== Deficiency ==
The deficiency of a finite presentation ⟨S | R⟩ is just |S| − |R| and the deficiency of a finitely presented group G, denoted def(G), is the maximum of the deficiency over all presentations of G. The deficiency of a finite group is non-positive. The Schur multiplicator of a finite group G can be generated by −def(G) generators, and G is efficient if this number is required.

== Geometric group theory ==
A presentation of a group determines a geometry, in the sense of geometric group theory: one has the Cayley graph, which has a metric, called the word metric. These are also two resulting orders, the weak order and the Bruhat order, and corresponding Hasse diagrams. An important example is in the Coxeter groups.

Further, some properties of this graph (the coarse geometry) are intrinsic, meaning independent of choice of generators.

== See also ==
- Nielsen transformation
- Presentation of a module
- Presentation of a monoid
- Set-builder notation
- Tietze transformation
