= Frattini =

Frattini is an Italian surname. Notable people with the surname include:

- Angelo Frattini, sculptor
- Franco Frattini, politician
- Giovanni Frattini, mathematician
  - Frattini argument
  - Frattini subgroup
- Francesco Frattini, cyclist
- Pietro Frattini, Belfiore martyr
- Enrico Frattini, general
- Federico Frattini, scholar
- Gianfranco Frattini, architect and designer
- Cristiano Frattini, racing cyclist
- Davide Frattini, cyclist
- Víctor Frattini, basketball player
- Marius Frattini, rugby league footballer
- Eric Frattini, writer
- Pierpaolo Frattini, rower
