= Richard Schwartz (mathematician) =

American mathematician

- Born: 11 August 1966; Los Angeles
- Education: Princeton University
- Occupations: Mathematician; university teacher
- Awards: Guggenheim Fellowship; Fellow of the American Mathematical Society (For contributions to dynamics, geometry, and experimental mathematics and for exposition., 2016, 2017)
- Scientific career
- Fields: Mathematics, group theory
- Doctoral advisor: William Thurston
- Doctoral students: Justin Olav Wyss-Gallifent, Blake Patrick Pelzer, Diana Davis, Ren Yi

Richard Evan Schwartz (born August 11, 1966) is an American mathematician notable for his contributions to geometric group theory and to an area of mathematics known as billiards. Geometric group theory is a relatively new area of mathematics beginning around the late 1980s which explores finitely generated groups, and seeks connections between their algebraic properties and the geometric spaces on which these groups act. He has worked on what mathematicians refer to as billiards, which are dynamical systems based on a convex shape in a plane. He has explored geometric iterations involving polygons, and he has been credited for developing the mathematical concept known as the pentagram map. In addition, he is author of a mathematics picture book for young children. In 2018 he is a professor of mathematics at Brown University.

== Career ==
Schwartz was born in Los Angeles on August 11, 1966. He attended John F. Kennedy High School in Los Angeles from 1981 to 1984, then earned a B. S. in mathematics from U.C.L.A. in 1987, and then a Ph. D. in mathematics from Princeton University in 1991 under the supervision of William Thurston. He taught at the University of Maryland. He is currently the Chancellor's Professor of Mathematics at Brown University. He lives with his wife and two daughters in Barrington, Rhode Island.

Schwartz is credited by other mathematicians for introducing the concept of the pentagram map. According to Schwartz's conception, a convex polygon would be inscribed with diagonal lines inside it, by drawing a line from one point to the next point—that is, by skipping over the immediate point on the polygon. The intersection points of the diagonals would form an inner polygon, and the process could be repeated. Schwartz observed these geometric patterns, partly by experimenting with computers. He has collaborated with mathematicians Valentin Ovsienko and Sergei Tabachnikov to show that the pentagram map is "completely integrable."

In his spare time he draws comic books, writes computer programs, listens to music and exercises. He admired the late Russian mathematician Vladimir Arnold and dedicated a paper to him. He played an April Fool's joke on fellow mathematics professors at Brown University by sending an email suggesting that students could be admitted randomly, along with references to bogus studies which purportedly suggested that there were benefits to having a certain population of the student body selected at random; the story was reported in the Brown Daily Herald. Colleagues such as mathematician Jeffrey Brock describe Schwartz as having a "very wry sense of humor."

In 2003, Schwartz was teaching one of his young daughters about number basics and developed a poster of the first 100 numbers using colorful monsters. This project gelled into a mathematics book for young children published in 2010, entitled You Can Count on Monsters, which became a bestseller. Each monster has a graphic which gives a mini-lesson about its properties, such as being a prime number or a lesson about factoring; for example, the graphic monster for the number five was a five-sided star or pentagram. A year after publication, it was featured prominently on National Public Radio in January 2011 and became a bestseller for a few days on the online bookstore Amazon as well as earning international acclaim. The Los Angeles Times suggested that the book helped to "take the scariness out of arithmetic." Mathematician Keith Devlin, on NPR, agreed, saying that Schwartz "very skillfully and subtly embeds mathematical ideas into the drawings."

== Publications ==
=== Selected contributions ===
- The quasi-isometry classification of rank one lattices: Any quasi-isometry of a hyperbolic lattice is equivalent to a commensurator.
- A proof of the 1989 Goldman–Parker conjecture: This is a complete description of the moduli space of the complex hyperbolic ideal triangle groups.
- A proof that a triangle has a periodic billiard path provided all its angles are less than 100 degrees.
- A solution of the 1960 Moser–Neumann problem: There exists an outer billiards system with an unbounded orbit.
- A solution of the 5-electron case of J. J. Thomson's 1904 problem: The triangular bipyramid is the configuration of 5 electrons on the sphere that minimizes the Coulomb potential.
- The introduction of the pentagram map and a later proof (with Valentin Ovsienko and Sergei Tabachnikov) of its complete integrability.

=== Published books ===
- Spherical CR Geometry and Dehn Surgery, Annals of Mathematics Studies no. 165 (2007), Princeton University Press
- Outer Billiards on Kites, Annals of Mathematics Studies no. 171 (2009)
- You Can Count on Monsters, American Mathematical Society, (2015)
- Mostly Surfaces, American Mathematical Society, (2011)
- The Octagonal PETs, American Mathematical Society, (2014)
- Really Big Numbers, American Mathematical Society, (2014), Winner of the 2015 MSRI Mathical Books for Kids from Tots to Teens Award
- Gallery of the Infinite, American Mathematical Society, (2016)
- The Projective Heat Map, American Mathematical Society, (2017)

== Selected awards ==
- 1993 National Science Foundation Postdoctoral Fellow
- 1996 Sloan Research Fellow
- 2002 Invited Speaker, International Congress of Mathematicians, Beijing
- 2003 Guggenheim Fellow
- 2009 Clay Research Scholar
- 2017 class of Fellows of the American Mathematical Society "for contributions to dynamics, geometry, and experimental mathematics and for exposition".

In June 2026, the conference "Geometry, Dynamics, and Computer-Assisted Proofs" is held in his honor at Heidelberg University.
