= Pentagram map =

Discrete dynamical system on polygons in the projective plane and on their moduli space

In mathematics, the pentagram map is a discrete dynamical system acting on polygons in the projective plane. It defines a new polygon whose vertices are obtained as the intersection points of the shortest diagonals of the initial polygon. This is a projectively equivariant procedure, hence it descends to the moduli space of polygons and defines another dynamical system (which is also referred to as the pentagram map). It was first introduced by Richard Schwartz in 1992.

The pentagram map on the moduli space is famous for its complete integrability and its link with cluster algebras.

It admits many generalizations in projective spaces and other settings.

== Introduction ==
=== Informal definition ===
==== On polygons ====
The pentagram map applied on a convex pentagon.

Initially, the pentagram map was defined for convex polygons (with at least five sides) on the Euclidean plane. Given such a polygon $P$ with $n$ sides, one can draw the "shortest diagonals", meaning the segments whose endpoints are a vertex and one of its second neighbors (as in the figure). The intersections of the shortest diagonals are then taken as the vertices of a new $n$-gon $T(P)$; this new polygon is the output of the pentagram map.

The same construction can be done on non-convex polygons, but there are several complications. First, some consecutive short diagonals may not intersect, so one must extend the segments to lines. Second, the image $T(P)$ can fail to be a new $n$-gon because some consecutive vertices could coincide. However, this generically doesn't happen. Finally, it is possible that two diagonals are parallel and don't intersect on the Euclidean plane. This is resolved by extending the Euclidean plane to the real projective plane by the addition of a line at infinity, where the intersection point lies (see the figure in the next section). Hence, the pentagram map is defined for generic polygons in the real projective plane.

More generally, the construction of the pentagram map is well defined whenever the concepts of lines and their intersections make sense. This is encompassed by the notion of a general projective plane, of which the real projective plane is one example; but the pentagram map can also be considered over other fields, for instance the complex numbers, which give the complex projective plane.

==== On the moduli space of polygons ====
Since the pentagram map is constructed by drawing lines and marking their intersections, it commutes with any transformation that sends lines to lines. Such maps are called projective transformations. Hence, polygons can be identified up to projective transformations. This identification gives the quotient space (technically called a moduli space) of classes of polygons.

The pentagram map on polygons induces another dynamical system on the moduli space, whose behavior differs quite a lot from the initial one. (Note: Compare the paragraph about the collapsing of convex polygons and the one about complete integrability.) The dynamic is trivial for the classes of pentagons and hexagons, but this is no longer the case for polygons with more vertices. (Note: See the paragraph about pentagons and hexagons.)

=== Historical elements ===
The pentagram map for general polygons was introduced in (Schwartz 1992), but the simplest case is the one of pentagons, hence the name "pentagram". Their study goes back to (Clebsch 1871), (Kasner 1928) and (Motzkin 1945).

The pentagram map interacts with some classical configuration theorems of projective geometry. It provides results analogous to the ones of Pascal's theorem and Brianchon's theorem. Some specific configurations make Desargues's theorem and Poncelet's porism appear. (Note: See the paragraph about Poncelet polygons.)

== Definitions and first properties ==
=== Definition of the map ===
The pentagram map on a convex pentagon, with vertices labeled.

The pentagram map applied on a self-intersecting (in particular, non-convex) pentagon. The vertex $w_2$ is on the line at infinity, because it is the intersection of two parallel lines.

Let $n\geq 5$ be an integer. A polygon $P$ with $n$ sides, or $n$-gon, is a tuple of vertices $(v_1,\dots,v_n)$ lying in some projective plane $\mathbb P ^2$, (Note: In the following, the figures represent polygons on the real plane, where the intuition is easier to grasp.) where the indices are understood modulo $n$. The dimension of the space of $n$-gons is $2n$.

Suppose that the vertices are in sufficiently general position, meaning that no consecutive triple of points are collinear. Taking the intersection of two consecutive "shortest" diagonals (Note: Meaning the line between a vertex $v_k$ and a "second neighbour" $v_{k\pm 2}$.) defines a new point
$$w_k := \overline{v_{k-1} v_{k+1}} \cap \overline{v_{k} v_{k+2}}.$$
This procedure defines a new $n$-gon $T(P)=(w_1,\dots,w_n)$.

The labeling of the indices of $T(P)$ is not canonical. In most papers, a choice is made at the beginning of the paper and the formulas are tuned accordingly.

The pentagram map on polygons is a birational map $T:(\mathbb P^2)^n$⇢$(\mathbb P^2)^n$. Indeed, each coordinate of $w_k$ is given as a rational function of the coordinates of $v_{k-1},\dots,v_{k+2}$, since it is defined as the intersection of lines passing by them. Moreover, the inverse map is given by taking the intersections $\overline{w_{k-2} w_{k-1}} \cap \overline{w_{k} w_{k+1}}$, which is rational for the same reason.

=== Moduli space ===
The pentagram map is defined by taking lines and intersections of them. The biggest group which maps lines to lines is the one of projective transformations, denoted by $\mathbb P \mathrm{GL}_{3}$. Such a transformation $M$ acts on a polygon $P$ by sending it to $M \cdot P:=(Mv_1,\dots,Mv_n)$. The pentagram map commutes with this action, and thereby induces another dynamical system on the moduli space of projective equivalence classes of polygons, whose dimension is $2n-8$.

=== Twisted polygons ===
An example of twisted heptagon on the real plane.

The pentagram map naturally generalizes to the larger space of twisted polygons (see the example of heptagon in the figure). For any integer $n\geq5$, a twisted $n$-gon $P$ is the data of:

- a bi-infinite sequence of points $(v_k)_{k\in\mathbb Z}$ in the projective plane (called the vertices),
- a projective transformation $M \in \mathbb P \mathrm{GL}_3$ (called the monodromy),

such that for any $k \in \mathbb Z$, the property $v_{k+n}=Mv_k$ is satisfied. The dimension of the space of twisted $n$-gons is $2n+8$.

When $M$ is the identity, this gives back the initial definition of polygons (which are said to be closed). The space of closed $n$-gons is of codimension $8$ in the space of twisted ones.

The action of projective transformations over the space of closed polygons generalizes to the space of twisted ones (the monodromy is changed by conjugation). This provides again a moduli space, of dimension $2n$.

== Collapsing of convex polygons ==
=== Exponential shrinking ===
The pentagram map iterated on a convex heptagon, exhibiting the convergence.

Let $P$ be a closed strictly convex polygon lying on the real plane. One of the first results proved by Richard Schwartz it that its iterates under the pentagram map shrink exponentially fast to a point, as illustrated in the figure. This follows from two facts.

1. The image of a strictly convex polygon is contained in its interior, and is also strictly convex.
2. There exists a constant $0< \eta_P<1$, depending on $P$, such that for any $N \in \mathbb N$, the diameters of the iterates verify the inequality $\operatorname{diam}(T^N(P))\leq\eta_P^N \operatorname{diam}(P).$

Hence, by Cantor's intersection theorem, the sequence of polygons collapses toward a point.

The behavior on the moduli space is very different, since the dynamics is recurrent. It is even a quasiperiodic motion, as discussed in the section about integrability.

=== Coordinates of the limit point ===
The limit point coordinates were given in (Glick 2020). They satisfy some degree 3 polynomial equations, whose coefficients are rational functions in the coordinates of the vertices of the starting polygon. The proof relies on the fact that the limit point must be an eigenline of a certain linear operator of $\mathbb R^3$, named Glick's operator.

Moreover, the polygon stays convex under iteration of the inverse pentagram map if and only if Glick's operator (seen as a projective mapping) is affine. The set formed by such polygons is an algebraic subvariety of codimension 2.

Glick's operator was reinterpreted in (Aboud & Izosimov 2022) as the infinitesimal monodromy of the polygon. The scaling symmetry is used to deform a closed polygon $P$ into a family of twisted ones $(P_z)_{z\in \mathbb C^*}$ with monodromy $M_z$. The infinitesimal monodromy is defined to be:
$$\left.\frac{dM_z}{dz}\right|_{z=1}.$$

=== Generalization ===
The collapsing of polygons may also happen in some generalization of the pentagram map, when considering some specific configurations of polygons in the real plane. The coordinates of the collapse point are given by a formula analogous to the one for the original pentagram map.

== Periodic orbits on the moduli space ==
For some configurations of closed polygons, the iterate of the pentagram map will send $P$ to a projectively equivalent polygon (up to some shift of the indices). This means that, on the moduli space, the orbit of the class of $P$ is periodic.

=== Pentagons and hexagons ===
The outward hexagon is projectively equivalent to the inward one, with respect to their labeling.

The following two facts are proved by checking cross-ratio equalities, so they are true for polygons in any projective plane (not just the real one).

The pentagram map $T$ is the identity on the moduli space of pentagons. The second iterate $T^2$ is the identity on the space of labeled hexagons, up to a shift of labeling (see the figure). This phenomenon doesn't generalize to generic polygons with at least seven sides, for which the motion is quasiperiodic.

==== Generalization ====
The result about pentagons and hexagons generalizes to some higher pentagram maps in $\mathbb P ^k$, for polygons with $k+3$ or $2k+2$ sides. The proof uses a generalization of the Gale transform.

=== Poncelet polygons ===
A polygon is said to be Poncelet (Note: The name comes from Jean-Victor Poncelet and his porism.) if it is inscribed in a conic and circumscribed about another one. (Note: In particular, pentagons are Poncelet since five points determine a conic.) For a convex Poncelet $n$-gon $P$ lying on the real projective plane, the polygon $T^2(P)$ is projectively equivalent to $P$.

In fact, when $n$ is odd, the converse is also true. However, this converse statement is no longer true when the polygons are considered over the complex projective plane since there are explicit counterexamples.

== Coordinates for the moduli space ==
The moduli space can be described by different coordinate systems. The following ones give simple expressions for the dynamics, as presented in the next section.

=== Corner coordinates ===
The geometric construction of the points defining the corner invariants.

Define the cross-ratio of four collinear points to be

$$[a,b,c,d]=\frac{(a-b)(c-d)}{(a-c)(b-d)}.$$

The corner invariants are a system of coordinates on the space of twisted polygons, constructed by taking intersections as in the figure. The left and right invariants are respectively defined (Note: The ordering of the vertices in the cross-ratios can differ from a paper to another one, which slightly changes the formulas in the following sections.) as the following cross-ratios:

$$x_k:=[v_{k-2},v_{k-1},\overline{v_{k-2}v_{k-1}}\cap\overline{v_{k}v_{k+1}},\overline{v_{k-2}v_{k-1}}\cap\overline{v_{k+1}v_{k+2}}],$$

$$y_k:=[\overline{v_{k+1}v_{k+2}}\cap\overline{v_{k-2}v_{k-1}}, \overline{v_{k+1}v_{k+2}}\cap\overline{v_{k-1}v_{k}},v_{k+1},v_{k+2}].$$

Since the cross-ratio is projective invariant, the sequences $(x_k)_{k \in \mathbb Z}$ and $(y_k)_{k \in \mathbb Z}$ associated to a twisted $n$-gon are $n$-periodic.

The corner invariants are elements of $\mathbb{P}^1\smallsetminus\{0,1,\infty\}$, and they realize an isomorphism of varieties between the moduli space of twisted $n$-gons and $(\mathbb{P}^1\smallsetminus\{0,1,\infty\})^{2n}$.

=== ab-coordinates ===
There is a second set of coordinates for the moduli space of twisted $n$-gons defined over any field $F$ satisfying $\mathrm{SL}_3(F)\cong \mathbb P\mathrm{GL}_3(F)$, and such that $n$ is not divisible by $3$.

The vertices $v_k$ in the projective plane $\mathbb P^2(F)$ can be lifted to vectors $V_k$ in the affine space $F^3$ so that each consecutive triple of vectors spans a parallelepiped having determinant equal to $1$. This leads to the relation defining the $ab$-coordinates:

$$V_{k+3} = a_k V_{k+2} + b_k V_{k+1} + V_k.$$

This bring out an analogy between twisted polygons and solutions of third order linear ordinary differential equations, normalized to have unit Wronskian.

They are linked to the corner coordinates by:

$$x_k=\frac{a_{k-2}}{b_{k-2}b_{k-1}},$$
$$y_k=-\frac{b_{k-1}}{a_{k-2}a_{k-1}}.$$

== Formulas on the moduli space ==
=== As a birational map ===
The pentagram map is a birational map on the moduli space, because it can be decomposed as the composition of two birational involutions. The corner invariants change in the following way:

$$x_k'=x_k\frac{1-x_{k-1} y_{k-1}}{1-x_{k+1}y_{k+1}},$$

$$y_k'=y_{k+1}\frac{1-x_{k+2} y_{k+2}}{1-x_k y_k}.$$

=== The scaling symmetry ===
The multiplicative group $F\smallsetminus\{0\}$ acts on the moduli space in the following way:

$$R_s\cdot(x_1,\dots,x_n,y_1,\dots,y_n)=(sx_1,\dots,sx_n,s^{-1}y_1,\dots,s^{-1}y_n),$$

where $R$ is called the scaling action and $s$ is the scaling parameter. This action commutes with the pentagram map on the moduli space (as presented in the previous formulas). This property is called the scaling symmetry, and is instrumental in proving the complete integrability of the dynamics.

== Invariant structures ==
=== Monodromy invariants ===
The monodromy invariants, introduced in (Schwartz 2008), are a collection of functions on the moduli space that are invariant under the pentagram map. The simplest examples of them are

$$O_n= x_1x_2\cdots x_{n}, \quad E_n = y_1y_2\cdots y_n.$$

The other monodromy invariants can be retrieved through different points of view: through the scaling symmetry, as combinatorial objects, or as some determinants. The one involving scaling symmetry is presented here.

Let $M\in \mathrm{GL}_3$ be a lift of the monodromy of a twisted $n$-gon. The quantities

$$\Omega_1=\frac{\operatorname{trace}^3(M)}{\det(M)}, \quad \Omega_2=\frac{\operatorname{trace}^3(M^{-1})}{\det(M^{-1})},$$

are independent of the choice of lift and are invariant under conjugation, so they are well defined for the projective class of the polygon. They are invariant under the pentagram map, since the monodromy matrix doesn't change. Now, the quantities

$$\tilde{\Omega}_1=O_n^2E_n\Omega_1, \quad \tilde{\Omega}_2=O_nE_n^2\Omega_2,$$

have the same properties, but turn out to be polynomials in the corner invariants. (Note: Some papers consider the cube roots of this functions, but it doesn't change the following definitions of the monodromy invariants.) They can be written as

$$\tilde{\Omega}_1=\biggl(\sum_{k=0}^{\lfloor n/2\rfloor}O_k\biggr)^3, \quad
\tilde{\Omega}_2=\biggl(\sum_{k=0}^{\lfloor n/2\rfloor}E_k\biggr)^3,$$

where each $O_k$ and $E_k$ are homogeneous polynomials respectively of weight $k$ and $-k$, meaning they change under the rescaling action on variables by

$$R_s(O_k)= s^k O_k, \quad R_s(E_k)= s^{-k} E_k.$$

The quantities $O_1,\dots,O_{\lfloor n/2 \rfloor},O_n, E_1,\dots,E_{\lfloor n/2 \rfloor},E_n,$ are unchanged by the dynamics, and are called the monodromy invariants. Moreover, they are algebraically independent.

==== Polygons on conics ====
Whenever $P$ is inscribed in a conic section, one has $O_k(P)=E_k(P)$ for all $k$. Moreover, if $P$ is circumscribed about another conic, (Note: See the paragraph about Poncelet polygons.) then its monodromy invariants are characterized by the pair of conics. For such odd-gons, the translation on the Jacobian variety (Note: See the paragraph about algebraic integrability.) is restricted to the Prym variety (which is a half-dimensional torus in the Jacobian).

=== Poisson bracket ===
An invariant Poisson bracket on the space of twisted polygons was found in (Ovsienko, Schwartz & Tabachnikov 2010). The monodromy invariants commute with respect to it:
$$\{O_i,O_j\}=\{O_i,E_j\}=\{E_i,E_j\}=0$$
for all $i,j$.

The Poisson bracket is defined in terms of the corner coordinates by:
$$\begin{align}
\{x_i,x_{i\pm1}\} &= \mp x_i x_{i+1}, \\
\{y_i,y_{i\pm 1}\} &= \mp y_i y_{i+1},
\end{align}$$
and
$$\{x_i,x_j\} = \{y_i,y_j\} = \{x_i,y_j\} = 0$$
for all other $i,j.$

=== The spectral curve ===
Let $\zeta$ be an element of the multiplicative group and $P_\zeta$ be the polygon obtained by applying the rescaling action $R_\zeta$ on $P$. A Lax matrix $\hat{T}(\zeta) \in \mathrm{GL}_3$ is a lift of the monodromy of $P_\zeta$ satisfying a zero-curvature equation. Then, the spectral function is the bivariate characteristic polynomial
$$Q(\lambda,\zeta) := \det(\lambda\operatorname{Id}-\hat{T}(\zeta)),$$
or some renormalization of it. The spectral curve is the projective completion of the affine curve defined by the equation $Q(\lambda,\zeta)=0$. It is invariant under the pentagram map, and the monodromy invariants appear as the coefficients of $Q$. Its geometric genus is $n-1$ if $n$ is odd, and $n-2$ if $n$ is even.

It was first introduced in (Soloviev 2013) for his proof of algebro-geometric integrability.

== Complete integrability ==
The pentagram map on the moduli space has been proved to be a completely integrable discrete dynamical system, both in the Arnold-Liouville (Note: Over the real numbers.) and the algebro-geometric (Note: Over algebraically closed fields of characteristic different from 2.) senses. In any case, this means that the moduli space is almost everywhere foliated by flat tori (or in the algebraic setting, Abelian varieties), where the motion is a translation. This generically induces a quasiperiodic motion on the corresponding torus.

=== Arnold–Liouville integrability ===
The proof of the integrability of the pentagram map on a real twisted polygon was achieved in (Ovsienko, Schwartz & Tabachnikov 2010). This is done by noticing that the monodromy invariants $O_n$ and $E_n$ are Casimir invariants for the Poisson bracket, meaning (in this context) that
$$\{O_n,f\}=\{E_n,f\} = 0$$
for every smooth function $f$. When $n$ is even, this is also true for the monodromy invariants $O_{\lfloor n/2 \rfloor }$ and $E_{\lfloor n/2 \rfloor }$.

This allows to consider the Casimir level set, where each Casimir invariant has a specified value. Because of Sard's theorem, any generic level set is a smooth manifold. This family of level sets forms a foliation in symplectic leaves, on which the Poisson bracket gives rise to a symplectic form.

Each of these symplectic leaves has an iso-monodromy foliation, namely, a decomposition into the common level sets of the remaining monodromy functions. By using again Sard's theorem, they are generically Lagrangian manifolds. Moreover, they are compact. Since the monodromy invariants Poisson-commute and there are enough of them, the discrete Liouville–Arnold theorem can be applied to prove that the level sets are flat tori over which the dynamics is a translation.

=== Algebro-geometric integrability ===
In (Soloviev 2013), it was shown that the pentagram map admits a Lax representation with a spectral parameter, which allows to prove its algebro-geometric integrability. This means that the space of polygons (either twisted or closed) is parametrized by its spectral data, consisting of its spectral curve, with marked points and a divisor given by a Floquet–Bloch equation. This gives an embedding to the Jacobian variety through the Abel–Jacobi map, where the motion is expressed in terms of translation. The previously defined Poisson bracket is also retrieved.

This integrability was generalized in (Weinreich 2022) from the field of complex numbers to any algebraically closed field of characteristic different from 2. The translation on a torus is replaced by a translation on an Abelian variety (in fact, a Jacobian variety again).

=== Dimension of the invariant manifold ===
For twisted $n$-gons, the dimension of the invariant manifold (tori or Jacobian varieties) is

$$\begin{cases}
n-1 & \text{when }n \text{ is odd,}\\
n-2 & \text{when }n \text{ is even.}
\end{cases}$$

Moreover, when $n$ is even, there are two isomorphic manifolds on which the iterates of the pentagram map alternate. But on each of them, the second iterate is a translation.

=== For closed polygons ===
There is no Poisson structure on the space of closed polygons. Nevertheless, the one from twisted polygons can be used to prove integrability.

Algebro-geometric integrability holds for closed polygons in a same manner as for the twisted ones. However, Arnold-Liouville integrability is proved for real closed polygons only when they are convex. This is done by restricting the Hamiltonian vector fields of monodromy functions to smaller dimensional tori, and showing that enough of them are still independent.

In both situation, the dimension of the invariant manifolds decreases by $3$ for closed $n$-gons (compared to the twisted case), and is equal to

$$\begin{cases}
n-4 & \text{when }n \text{ is odd,}\\
n-5 & \text{when }n \text{ is even.}
\end{cases}$$

== Connections to other topics ==
=== The Boussinesq equation ===
The continuous limit of a polygon is a parametrized curve in the plane. When the time parameter is suitably chosen, the continuous limit of the pentagram map is the Boussinesq equation. This partial differential equation models water waves under some conditions, which is a classical example of integrable system.

Here is a description of the geometric action of the Boussinesq equation. Given a locally convex curve $C:\mathbb R\to \mathbb R^2$ and real numbers $x$ and $t$, consider the chord connecting $C(x-t)$ to $C(x+t)$. The envelope of all these chords is a new curve $C_t(x)$. When $t$ is extremely small, the curve $C_t(x)$ is a good model for the time $t$ evolution of the original curve $C_0(x)$ under the Boussinesq equation. This construction is also similar to the pentagram map. Moreover, the pentagram invariant bracket is a discretization of an invariant Poisson bracket associated to the Boussinesq equation.

=== Cluster algebras ===
The pentagram map and some of its generalizations are identified as special cases of discrete dynamical systems powered by cluster algebras. Using the results from (Goncharov & Kenyon 2013), this provides a link with the Poisson–Lie groups, dimer models and other so-called cluster-integrable systems. These methods allow to retrieve the Poisson bracket and Hamiltonians used to prove complete integrability and provide Lax representations.

=== Octahedron recurrence ===
Using a method to compute determinants called Dodgson condensation, (Schwartz 2008) proves that the pentagram map satisfies a property called the "octahedron recurrence". It is also shared by higher dimensional pentagram maps defined through cluster algebras mutations, referred as "$T$-systems".

Furthermore, the pentagram map (together with other dynamical systems defined through geometric constructions) verifies a generalization of the octahedron recurrence.

=== Singularity theory ===
The pentagram map exhibits a property called singularity confinement, which is a typical phenomenon in integrable systems. It states that if a polygon $P$ is singular for the pentagram map $T$, then there exists an integer $m$ such that $P$ not singular for the iterate map $T^m$.

Moreover, the pentagram map (along with some of its generalizations and other discrete dynamical systems) exhibit the Devron property. (Note: The name comes from an episode of Star Trek.) This means that if a polygon $P$ is singular for some iterate of the pentagram map $T^m$, then it will also be singular for some iterate of the inverse map $T^{-m'}$.

== Generalizations ==
The definition of polygons still makes sense in any projective space $\mathbb P^d$ under the action of the projective group $\mathbb P \mathrm{GL}_{d+1}$, and even in other spaces with their associated groups.

The pentagram map can be generalized in many ways, and some of them are presented here. Not all of them are integrable. Some are discretizations of PDEs from the KdV hierarchy, seen as higher dimensional version of Boussinesq or KP equations. The description of all generalized pentagram maps in terms of cluster algebras is still an open question.

=== Polygons in general positions ===
Let $d \geq 2$ and $P$ be a twisted polygon of $\mathbb P^d$ in general position.

==== Short diagonal pentagram maps ====
The $k$-th short diagonal hyperplane $H_k^{sh}$ is uniquely defined by passing through the vertices $v_k,v_{k+2},\dots,v_{k+2d-2}$. Generically, the intersection of $d$ consecutive hyperplanes uniquely defines a new point

$$T_{sh}v_k:=H_k^{sh}\cap H_{k+1}^{sh}\cap \dots \cap H_{k+d-1}^{sh}.$$

Doing this for every vertex defines a new twisted polygon. This map, denoted by $T_{sh}$, is again projectively equivariant.

==== Generalized pentagram maps ====
The previous procedure can be generalized. Let $I=(i_1,\dots,i_{d-1}),J=(j_1,\dots,j_{d-1})$ be two sets of integers, respectively called the jump tuple and the intersection tuple. Define $H_k^I$ to be the unique hyperplane passing through the vertices $v_k,v_{k+i_1},\dots,v_{k+i_1+\dots+i_{d-1}}$. A new point is given by the intersection

$$T_{I,J}v_k:=H_k^I \cap H_{k+j_1}^I \cap \dots \cap H_{k+j_1+\dots +j_{d-1}}^I.$$

The map $T_{I,J}$ is called a generalized pentagram map. The original pentagram map is recovered by considering $d=2,I=(2),J=(1)$.

Integrability can be numerically tested by picking a random polygon $P$ with rational coordinates and studying the growth rate of the height of its iterates. This is called the diophantine integrability test, and some generalized pentagram maps don't seem to pass it. However, it is conjectured that the maps $T_{I,I}$ are integrable for any $I$.

Some of these maps are discretizations of higher dimensional counterpart of the Boussinesq equation in the KdV hierarchy.

==== Dented pentagram maps ====
Fix an integer $m\in \{1,\dots ,d-1\}$. Consider the jump tuple $I_m:=(1,\dots,1,2,1,\dots,1)$, where the $2$ is at the $m$-th place, and the intersection tuple $J:=(1,\dots,1)$. The dented pentagram map is $T_m :=T_{I_m,J}$. They are proved to be integrable.

For an integer $p \geq 2$, the deep dented pentagram map (of depth $p$) $T_m^p$ is the same map as before, but the number $2$ in the definition of $I_m$ is replaced by $p$. This kind of pentagram maps are integrable too.

=== Corrugated polygons ===
A twisted polygon $P$ lying in $\mathbb P^d$ is said to be corrugated if for any $k\in \mathbb Z$, the vertices $v_k,v_{k+1},v_{k+d},v_{k+d+1}$ span a projective two-dimensional plane. Such polygons are not in general position. A new point is defined by

$$T_\text{cor}v_k:=\overline{v_k v_{k+d}}\cap \overline{v_{k+1} v_{k+d+1}}.$$

The map $T_\text{cor}$ yields a new corrugated polygon. This dynamics is completely Liouville-integrable.

In fact, they can be retrieved as some dented pentagram map applied on corrugated polygons.

=== Grassmannian polygons ===
Let $d \geq 3, m \geq 1$ be integers. The pentagram map can also be generalized to the Grassmannian space $\mathrm{Gr}(m,md)$, which consists of $m$-dimensional linear subspaces of an $md$-dimensional vector space. When $m=1$, the linear subspaces are lines, which retrieves the definition of projective spaces $\mathbb P^d$.

A point $v\in\operatorname{Gr}(m,md)$ is represented by an $md \times m$ matrix $X_v$ such that its columns form a basis of $v$. Consider the action of the general linear group $\mathrm{GL}_{md}$ by multiplication on the left of $X_v$. This defines an action on the Grassmannian, even though it is not faithful. (Note: Because there can be many lifts for $v$, and because some matrices act trivially.) Hence, the polygons of $\mathrm{Gr}(m,md)$ and their moduli spaces are defined as before, after the change of underlying group.

Depending on the parity of $d$, one can define linear subspaces spanned by some $X_{v_k}$'s such that taking their intersection generically defines a new point $v\in\mathrm{Gr}(m,md)$. This generalization of the pentagram map is integrable in a noncommutative sense.

=== Over rings ===
The pentagram map admits a generalization by considering projective planes over stably finite rings, instead of fields. In particular, this retrieves the pentagram map over Grassmannians. Again, it admits a Lax representation.

== Works cited ==
- Aboud, Quinton; Izosimov, Anton (2022-03-23). "The Limit Point of the Pentagram Map and Infinitesimal Monodromy". International Mathematics Research Notices. 2022 (7): 5383–5397. doi:10.1093/imrn/rnaa258. ISSN 1073-7928.
- Affolter, Niklas Christoph; George, Terrence; Ramassamy, Sanjay (2025-06-03). "Integrable Dynamics in Projective Geometry via Dimers and Triple Crossing Diagram Maps on the Cylinder". Symmetry, Integrability and Geometry: Methods and Applications. doi:10.3842/sigma.2025.040. ISSN 1815-0659.
- Affolter, Niklas Christoph; de Tilière, Béatrice; Melotti, Paul (March 2025). "The Schwarzian Octahedron Recurrence (dSKP Equation) II: Geometric Systems". Discrete & Computational Geometry. 73 (2): 370–436. arXiv:2208.00244. doi:10.1007/s00454-024-00640-2. ISSN 0179-5376.
- Berger, Marcel (2005). "Dynamiser la géométrie élémentaire: introduction à des travaux de Richard Schwartz". Rendiconti di Matematica e delle sue Applicazioni (in French). 25 (VII): 127–153.
- Bolsinov, Alexey; Matveev, Vladimir S.; Miranda, Eva; Tabachnikov, Serge (2018-10-28). "Open problems, questions and challenges in finite- dimensional integrable systems". Philosophical Transactions of the Royal Society A: Mathematical, Physical and Engineering Sciences. 376 (2131) 20170430. arXiv:1804.03737. Bibcode:2018RSPTA.37670430B. doi:10.1098/rsta.2017.0430. ISSN 1364-503X. PMC 6158379. PMID 30224421.
- Clebsch, A. (1871-09-01). "Ueber das ebene Fünfeck". Mathematische Annalen (in German). 4 (3): 476–489. doi:10.1007/BF01455078. ISSN 1432-1807.
- Dirdak, Abigayle (2024), "The Gale Transform and the Pentagram Map", Doctoral dissertation, University of Arizona
- Felipe, Raúl; Marí-Beffa, Gloria (2019-06-03). "The pentagram map on Grassmannians". Annales de l'Institut Fourier. 69 (1): 421–456. doi:10.5802/aif.3248. ISSN 1777-5310.
- Fock, Vladimir V.; Marshakov, Andrey (2016), "Loop Groups, Clusters, Dimers and Integrable Systems", Advanced Courses in Mathematics - CRM Barcelona, Cham: Springer International Publishing, pp. 1–65, doi:10.1007/978-3-319-33578-0_1, ISBN 978-3-319-33577-3
- Gekhtman, Michael; Izosimov, Anton (2025-01-01). "Integrable Systems and Cluster Algebras". Encyclopedia of Mathematical Physics (2nd ed.): 294–308. arXiv:2403.07287. doi:10.1016/B978-0-323-95703-8.00029-X. ISBN 978-0-323-95706-9.
- Gekhtman, Michael; Shapiro, Michael; Tabachnikov, Serge; Vainshtein, Alek (2012). "Higher pentagram maps, weighted directed networks, and cluster dynamics". Electronic Research Announcements in Mathematical Sciences. 19: 1–17. doi:10.3934/era.2012.19.1. ISSN 1935-9179.
- Glick, Max (2011). "The pentagram map and Y-patterns". Advances in Mathematics. 227 (2): 1019–1045. doi:10.1016/j.aim.2011.02.018. ISSN 0001-8708.
- Glick, Max (2012-12-19). "On singularity confinement for the pentagram map". Journal of Algebraic Combinatorics. 38 (3): 597–635. doi:10.1007/s10801-012-0417-6. ISSN 0925-9899.
- Glick, Max (2015). "The Devron property". Journal of Geometry and Physics. 87: 161–189. arXiv:1312.6881. Bibcode:2015JGP....87..161G. doi:10.1016/j.geomphys.2014.07.029. ISSN 0393-0440.
- Glick, Max (2020-05-07). "The Limit Point of the Pentagram Map". International Mathematics Research Notices. 2020 (9): 2818–2831. doi:10.1093/imrn/rny110. ISSN 1073-7928.
- Glick, Max; Pylyavskyy, Pavlo (2016-03-07). "Y-meshes and generalized pentagram maps". Proceedings of the London Mathematical Society. 112 (4): 753–797. arXiv:1503.02057. doi:10.1112/plms/pdw007. ISSN 0024-6115.
- Goncharov, Alexander B.; Kenyon, Richard (2013). "Dimers and cluster integrable systems". Annales scientifiques de l'École normale supérieure. 46 (5): 747–813. arXiv:1107.5588. doi:10.24033/asens.2201. ISSN 0012-9593.
- Grammaticos, Basile; Ramani, Alfred; Papageorgiou, Vassilios (1991-09-30). "Do integrable mappings have the Painlevé property?". Physical Review Letters. 67 (14): 1825–1828. Bibcode:1991PhRvL..67.1825G. doi:10.1103/physrevlett.67.1825. ISSN 0031-9007. PMID 10044260.
- Hand, Leaha; Izosimov, Anton (2025). "Pentagram maps over rings, Grassmannians, and skewers". Journal of the European Mathematical Society. arXiv:2405.06122. doi:10.4171/JEMS/1751.
- Izosimov, Anton (2016). "Pentagrams, inscribed polygons, and Prym varieties". Electronic Research Announcements in Mathematical Sciences. 23: 25–40. doi:10.3934/era.2016.23.004. ISSN 1935-9179.
- Izosimov, Anton (2021-11-04). "Intersecting the sides of a polygon". Proceedings of the American Mathematical Society. 150 (2): 639–649. arXiv:2012.02400. doi:10.1090/proc/15698. ISSN 0002-9939.
- Izosimov, Anton (2022a). "The pentagram map, Poncelet polygons, and commuting difference operators". Compositio Mathematica. 158 (5): 1084–1124. doi:10.1112/S0010437X22007345. ISSN 0010-437X.
- Izosimov, Anton (2022b). "Pentagram maps and refactorization in Poisson-Lie groups". Advances in Mathematics. 404 108476. doi:10.1016/j.aim.2022.108476. ISSN 0001-8708.
- Izosimov, Anton (2022c). "Dimers, networks, and cluster integrable systems". Geometric and Functional Analysis. arXiv:2108.04975. doi:10.1007/s00039-022-00605-8. ISSN 1016-443X.
- Kasner, Edward (1928). "A Projective Theorem on the Plane Pentagon". The American Mathematical Monthly. 35 (7): 352–356. doi:10.1080/00029890.1928.11986851. ISSN 0002-9890.
- Kato, Tsuyoshi (2017). "Chapter 5 - Pentagram map and tropical geometry". Dynamical scale transform in tropical geometry. Singapore: World Scientific Publishing. ISBN 978-981-4635-38-7.
- Kedem, Rinat; Vichitkunakorn, Panupong (2015-01-01). "T-systems and the pentagram map". Journal of Geometry and Physics. Finite dimensional integrable systems: on the crossroad of algebra, geometry and physics. 87: 233–247. arXiv:1405.6758. Bibcode:2015JGP....87..233K. doi:10.1016/j.geomphys.2014.07.003. ISSN 0393-0440.
- Khesin, Boris; Soloviev, Fedor (2013). "Integrability of higher pentagram maps". Mathematische Annalen. 357 (3): 1005–1047. arXiv:1204.0756. doi:10.1007/s00208-013-0922-5. ISSN 0025-5831.
- Khesin, Boris; Soloviev, Fedor (2015a). "Non-integrability vs. integrability in pentagram maps". Journal of Geometry and Physics. 87: 275–285. arXiv:1404.6221. Bibcode:2015JGP....87..275K. doi:10.1016/j.geomphys.2014.07.027.
- Khesin, Boris; Soloviev, Fedor (2015b). "The geometry of dented pentagram maps". Journal of the European Mathematical Society. 18 (1): 147–179. doi:10.4171/jems/586. ISSN 1435-9855.
- Marí-Beffa, Gloria (2012-12-13). "On Generalizations of the Pentagram Map: Discretizations of AGD Flows". Journal of Nonlinear Science. 23 (2): 303–334. arXiv:1103.5047. doi:10.1007/s00332-012-9152-3. ISSN 0938-8974.
- Marí-Beffa, Gloria (2014-03-24). "On Integrable Generalizations of the Pentagram Map". International Mathematics Research Notices. doi:10.1093/imrn/rnu044. ISSN 1073-7928.
- Motzkin, Theodor (1945). "The pentagon in the projective plane, with a comment on Napier's rule". Bulletin of the American Mathematical Society. 51 (12): 985–989. doi:10.1090/S0002-9904-1945-08488-2. ISSN 0002-9904.
- Ovenhouse, Nicholas (2020). "Non-commutative integrability of the Grassmann pentagram map". Advances in Mathematics. 373 107309. doi:10.1016/j.aim.2020.107309.
- Ovsienko, Valentin; Schwartz, Richard Evan; Tabachnikov, Serge (2009). "Quasiperiodic Motion for the Pentagram Map" (pdf). Electronic Research Announcements in Mathematical Sciences. 16: 1–8. arXiv:0901.1585. Bibcode:2009arXiv0901.1585O. doi:10.3934/era.2009.16.1. S2CID 10821671.
- Ovsienko, Valentin; Schwartz, Richard; Tabachnikov, Serge (2010-10-01). "The Pentagram Map: A Discrete Integrable System". Communications in Mathematical Physics. 299 (2): 409–446. arXiv:0810.5605. Bibcode:2010CMaPh.299..409O. doi:10.1007/s00220-010-1075-y. ISSN 1432-0916.
- Ovsienko, Valentin; Schwartz, Richard Evan; Tabachnikov, Serge (2013-09-15). "Liouville–Arnold integrability of the pentagram map on closed polygons". Duke Mathematical Journal. 162 (12): 2149–2196. arXiv:1107.3633. doi:10.1215/00127094-2348219. ISSN 0012-7094.
- Schwartz, Richard Evan (1992-01-01). "The Pentagram Map". Experimental Mathematics. 1 (1): 71–81. doi:10.1080/10586458.1992.10504248 (inactive 19 November 2026). ISSN 1058-6458.
- Schwartz, Richard Evan (2001). "The Pentagram Map is Recurrent". Experimental Mathematics. 10 (4): 519–528. doi:10.1080/10586458.2001.10504671. ISSN 1058-6458.
- Schwartz, Richard Evan (2008-09-01). "Discrete monodromy, pentagrams, and the method of condensation". Journal of Fixed Point Theory and Applications. 3 (2): 379–409. arXiv:0709.1264. doi:10.1007/s11784-008-0079-0. ISSN 1661-7746.
- Schwartz, Richard Evan (2013-10-02). "Pentagram Spirals". Experimental Mathematics. 22 (4): 384–405. arXiv:1304.5708. doi:10.1080/10586458.2013.830582. ISSN 1058-6458.
- Schwartz, Richard Evan (2015). "The pentagram integrals for Poncelet families". Journal of Geometry and Physics. 87: 432–449. Bibcode:2015JGP....87..432S. doi:10.1016/j.geomphys.2014.07.024.
- Schwartz, Richard Evan (2017). The projective heat map. Mathematical surveys and monographs. Providence, Rhode Island: American Mathematical Society. ISBN 978-1-4704-3514-1.
- Schwartz, Richard (2026a). "The Flapping Birds in the Pentagram Zoo". Arnold Mathematical Journal. 11 (4) 002: 10. doi:10.56994/ARMJ.011.004.002. ISSN 2199-6792.
- Schwartz, Richard (2026b). "A Stroll Through the Pentagram Zoo". Notices of the American Mathematical Society. 73 (7). doi:10.1090/noti3374. ISSN 1088-9477.
- Schwartz, Richard Evan; Tabachnikov, Serge (2010). "Elementary Surprises in Projective Geometry". The Mathematical Intelligencer. 32 (3): 31–34. arXiv:0910.1952. doi:10.1007/s00283-010-9137-8. hdl:21.11116/0000-0004-24EE-8. ISSN 0343-6993.
- Schwartz, Richard Evan; Tabachnikov, Serge (2011-09-02). "The Pentagram Integrals on Inscribed Polygons". The Electronic Journal of Combinatorics. 18 (1) P171. doi:10.37236/658. ISSN 1077-8926.
- Soloviev, Fedor (1 December 2013), "Integrability of the pentagram map", Duke Mathematical Journal, 162 (15): 2815–2853, arXiv:1106.3950, doi:10.1215/00127094-2382228
- Tabachnikov, Serge (2019-05-07). "Kasner Meets Poncelet". The Mathematical Intelligencer. 41 (4): 56–59. arXiv:1707.09267. doi:10.1007/s00283-019-09897-5. ISSN 0343-6993.
- Tupan, Alexandru (2022-07-03). "Pentagram Configurations for Pentagons and Hexagons". The American Mathematical Monthly. 129 (6): 554–565. doi:10.1080/00029890.2022.2060695. ISSN 0002-9890.
- Wang, Bao (2023). "Pentagram-Type Maps and the Discrete KP Equation". Journal of Nonlinear Science. 33 (6) 101. Bibcode:2023JNS....33..101W. doi:10.1007/s00332-023-09961-7. ISSN 0938-8974.
- Weinreich, Max H. (2022-11-25). "The algebraic dynamics of the pentagram map". Ergodic Theory and Dynamical Systems. 43 (10): 3460–3505. doi:10.1017/etds.2022.82. ISSN 0143-3857.
