= Hanna Neumann conjecture =

Proposition in group theory

In the mathematical subject of group theory, the Hanna Neumann conjecture is a statement about the rank of the intersection of two finitely generated subgroups of a free group. The conjecture was posed by Hanna Neumann in 1957. In 2011, a strengthened version of the conjecture (see below) was proved independently by Joel Friedman and by Igor Mineyev.

In 2017, a third proof of the Strengthened Hanna Neumann conjecture, based on homological arguments inspired by pro-p-group considerations, was published by Andrei Jaikin-Zapirain.

== History ==
The subject of the conjecture was originally motivated by a 1954 theorem of Howson who proved that the intersection of any two finitely generated subgroups of a free group is always finitely generated, that is, has finite rank. In this paper Howson proved that if H and K are subgroups of a free group F(X) of finite ranks n ≥ 1 and m ≥ 1 then the rank s of H ∩ K satisfies:

s − 1 ≤ 2mn − m − n.

In a 1956 paper Hanna Neumann improved this bound by showing that:

s − 1 ≤ 2mn − 2m − n.

In a 1957 addendum, Hanna Neumann further improved this bound to show that under the above assumptions

s − 1 ≤ 2(m − 1)(n − 1).

She also conjectured that the factor of 2 in the above inequality is not necessary and that one always has

s − 1 ≤ (m − 1)(n − 1).

This statement became known as the Hanna Neumann conjecture.

== Formal statement ==
Let H, K ≤ F(X) be two nontrivial finitely generated subgroups of a free group F(X) and let L = H ∩ K be the intersection of H and K. The conjecture says that in this case

rank(L) − 1 ≤ (rank(H) − 1)(rank(K) − 1).

Here for a group G the quantity rank(G) is the rank of G, that is, the smallest size of a generating set for G. Every subgroup of a free group is known to be free itself and the rank of a free group is equal to the size of any free basis of that free group.

== Strengthened Hanna Neumann conjecture ==
If H, K ≤ G are two subgroups of a group G and if a, b ∈ G define the same double coset HaK = HbK then the subgroups H ∩ aKa^{−1} and H ∩ bKb^{−1} are conjugate in G and thus have the same rank. It is known that if H, K ≤ F(X) are finitely generated subgroups of a finitely generated free group F(X) then there exist at most finitely many double coset classes HaK in F(X) such that H ∩ aKa^{−1} ≠ {1}. Suppose that at least one such double coset exists and let a_{1},...,a_{n} be all the distinct representatives of such double cosets. The strengthened Hanna Neumann conjecture, formulated by her son Walter Neumann (1990), states that in this situation

$$\sum_{i=1}^n [{\rm rank}(H\cap a_iKa_{i}^{-1})-1]  \le ({\rm rank}(H)-1)({\rm rank}(K)-1).$$

The strengthened Hanna Neumann conjecture was proved in 2011 by Joel Friedman. Shortly after, another proof was given by Igor Mineyev.

== Partial results and other generalizations ==
- In 1971 Burns improved Hanna Neumann's 1957 bound and proved that under the same assumptions as in Hanna Neumann's paper one has

s ≤ 2mn − 3m − 2n + 4.

- In a 1990 paper, Walter Neumann formulated the strengthened Hanna Neumann conjecture (see statement above).
- Tardos (1992) established the strengthened Hanna Neumann Conjecture for the case where at least one of the subgroups H and K of F(X) has rank two. As most other approaches to the Hanna Neumann conjecture, Tardos used the technique of Stallings subgroup graphs for analyzing subgroups of free groups and their intersections.
- Warren Dicks (1994) established the equivalence of the strengthened Hanna Neumann conjecture and a graph-theoretic statement that he called the amalgamated graph conjecture.
- Arzhantseva (2000) proved that if H is a finitely generated subgroup of infinite index in F(X), then, in a certain statistical meaning, for a generic finitely generated subgroup $K$ in $F(X)$, we have H ∩ gKg^{−1} = {1} for all g in F. Thus, the strengthened Hanna Neumann conjecture holds for every H and a generic K.
- In 2001 Dicks and Formanek established the strengthened Hanna Neumann conjecture for the case where at least one of the subgroups H and K of F(X) has rank at most three.
- Khan (2002) and, independently, Meakin and Weil (2002), showed that the conclusion of the strengthened Hanna Neumann conjecture holds if one of the subgroups H, K of F(X) is positively generated, that is, generated by a finite set of words that involve only elements of X but not of X^{−1} as letters.
- Ivanov and Dicks and Ivanov obtained analogs and generalizations of Hanna Neumann's results for the intersection of subgroups H and K of a free product of several groups.
- Wise (2005) claimed that the strengthened Hanna Neumann conjecture implies another long-standing group-theoretic conjecture which says that every one-relator group with torsion is coherent (that is, every finitely generated subgroup in such a group is finitely presented).

== See also ==
- Geometric group theory
