= Melnikov group =

Characteristic subgroup of a profinite group

In mathematics, the Melnikov group or Melnikov subgroup of a profinite group $G$, denoted $M(G)$, is the intersection of all maximal open normal subgroups of $G$. If $G$ is nontrivial, then $M(G)$ is a proper closed subgroup invariant under every continuous automorphism of $G$ (that is, it is topologically characteristic). Fried and Jarden use the term "Melnikov group", while later literature also uses "Melnikov subgroup".

The construction is a normal-subgroup analogue of the Frattini subgroup $\Phi(G)$. Whereas the Frattini subgroup is defined using all maximal open subgroups, the Melnikov group uses only maximal open normal subgroups. Equivalently, $M(G)$ is the intersection of the kernels of all continuous epimorphisms from $G$ onto finite simple groups. It therefore records the part of $G$ that is invisible in every finite simple quotient.

== Definition and simple quotients ==
Throughout, homomorphisms of profinite groups are understood to be continuous. A proper open normal subgroup $N$ of $G$ is maximal open normal if there is no proper open normal subgroup of $G$ strictly between $N$ and $G$. The Melnikov group is

$M(G)=\bigcap\{N\trianglelefteq G:N\text{ is maximal open normal in }G\}.$

If $N$ is maximal open normal, then $G/N$ is a finite simple group. Conversely, if $S$ is a finite simple group and $\varphi:G\twoheadrightarrow S$ is an epimorphism, then $\ker\varphi$ is maximal open normal. Thus

$M(G)=\bigcap\{\ker\varphi:\varphi:G\twoheadrightarrow S,\; S\text{ is a finite simple group}\}.$

For a finite simple group $S$, define

$$M_S(G)=\bigcap\{N\trianglelefteq G:G/N\cong S\},$$

with $M_S(G)=G$ when $G$ has no quotient isomorphic to $S$. Then

$$M(G)=\bigcap_S M_S(G).$$

For each $S$, the quotient $G/M_S(G)$ is a Cartesian power of $S$. More precisely,

$$G/M(G)\cong\prod_S S^{r_G(S)},$$

where $S$ ranges over the isomorphism classes of finite simple groups and $r_G(S)$ is the $S$-rank of $G$, equivalently the cardinal number of copies of $S$ occurring in $G/M_S(G)$. In particular,

$M(G)=1$ if and only if $G$ is a Cartesian product of finite simple groups.

This also characterizes $G/M(G)$ as the largest quotient of $G$ that is a Cartesian product of finite simple groups: every homomorphism from $G$ onto such a product factors through $G/M(G)$.

== Basic properties ==
The Melnikov group has several useful functorial and normal-generation properties. Let $G$ and $H$ be profinite groups.

- If $\alpha:G\twoheadrightarrow H$ is an epimorphism, then $\alpha(M(G))=M(H)$.
- If $N$ is a closed normal subgroup of $G$, then $M(N)\leq M(G)$.
- If $N$ is a closed normal subgroup of $G$ and $NM(G)=G$, then $N=G$.

The last property expresses the role of $M(G)$ in normal generation: adjoining $M(G)$ to a proper closed normal subgroup cannot make it equal to the whole group.

== Relation with the Frattini subgroup ==
For every profinite group $G$, the Frattini subgroup is contained in the Melnikov group:

$\Phi(G)\leq M(G).$

The containment can be strict. For the symmetric group $S_3$, viewed as a finite profinite group, the only maximal proper normal subgroup is $A_3$, so

$$M(S_3)=A_3,$$

whereas $\Phi(S_3)=1$.

For pro-$p$ groups, however, the two constructions agree. Every maximal open subgroup of a pro-$p$ group is normal and has index $p$, and consequently

$$M(G)=\Phi(G)$$

for every pro-$p$ group $G$.

== Melnikov covers ==
An epimorphism $\alpha:G\twoheadrightarrow H$ of profinite groups is called a Melnikov cover if

$\ker\alpha\leq M(G).$

This condition has a normal-generation interpretation: $\alpha$ is a Melnikov cover if and only if every closed normal subgroup $N\trianglelefteq G$ satisfying $\alpha(N)=H$ is equal to $G$. Melnikov covers are closed under composition. Moreover, a Melnikov cover induces an isomorphism

$G/M(G)\;\xrightarrow{\ \cong\ }\;H/M(H).$

Thus a Melnikov cover preserves the quotient obtained after factoring out the Melnikov subgroup.

== Uses ==
The Melnikov subgroup occurs in constructions that separate abelian and simple quotients of profinite groups. Bary-Soroker, Fehm and Wiese define a generalized derived subgroup $D(G)$ satisfying

$$D(G)=M(G)\cap G',$$

where $G'$ is the commutator subgroup. Iterating this operation gives their abelian-simple length, which they use in criteria for the preservation of the Hilbertian property in algebraic extensions.

Also, this subgroup appears in modern structure theory for profinite groups

== See also ==
- Frattini subgroup
- Profinite group
- Pro-p group
- Simple group

== Bibliography ==
- Bary-Soroker, Lior; Fehm, Arno; Wiese, Gabor (2016). "Hilbertian fields and Galois representations". Journal für die reine und angewandte Mathematik. 2016 (712): 123–139. arXiv:1203.4217. doi:10.1515/crelle-2013-0116.
- Fried, Michael D.; Jarden, Moshe (2023). Field Arithmetic. Ergebnisse der Mathematik und ihrer Grenzgebiete. 3. Folge. Vol. 11 (4th ed.). Cham: Springer. doi:10.1007/978-3-031-28020-7. ISBN 978-3-031-28019-1.
- Klopsch, Benjamin; Quick, Martyn (2023). "The structure of groups with all proper quotients virtually nilpotent". Pacific Journal of Mathematics. 325 (1): 147–189. arXiv:2211.07567. doi:10.2140/pjm.2023.325.147. hdl:10023/28326.
