= James Wiegold =

Welsh mathematician

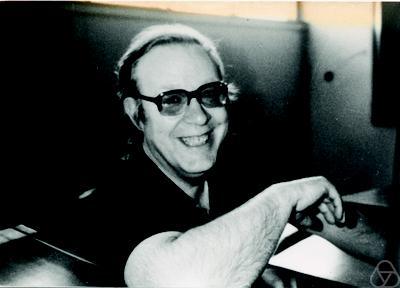
- Born: 15 April 1934; Trecenydd, Caerphilly, Wales
- Died: 4 August 2009 (aged 75); Penarth, Vale of Glamorgan, Wales
- Education: University of Manchester
- Known for: Contributions to group theory
- Scientific career
- Workplaces: University College of North Staffordshire; University of Manchester; University College of South Wales and Monmouthshire; Australian National University; University College, Cardiff
- Doctoral advisor: Bernhard Neumann

James Wiegold (15 April 1934 – 4 August 2009) was a Welsh mathematician.

Born in Trecenydd, Caerphilly, he earned a Ph.D. at the University of Manchester, England in 1958, studying under Bernhard Neumann, and is most notable for his contributions to group theory.

Wiegold died from leukaemia on 4 August 2009, in Penarth, Vale of Glamorgan.

== Career ==
- Assistant Lecturer, University College of North Staffordshire (now Keele University), 1957–1960
- Lecturer, University of Manchester, 1960–1963
- Lecturer, University College of South Wales and Monmouthshire (now Cardiff University), 1963–1966
- Senior Lecturer, University College of South Wales and Monmouthshire (now Cardiff University), 1966–1969
- Visiting Senior Lecturer and Visiting Reader, Australian National University, 1968–1970
- Reader, University College of South Wales and Monmouthshire (now Cardiff University), 1969–1974
- Professor, University College, Cardiff (now Cardiff University), 1974–his death
- Dean of Science, University College, Cardiff (now Cardiff University), 1982–1985
