= Albert G. Howson =

British mathematician (1931–2022)

Albert Geoffrey Howson (1931 – 1 November 2022) was a British mathematician and educationist.

== Early life ==
Howson attended Castleford Grammar School.

== Mathematical career ==
Howson started to work as algebraist and in 1954 published the Howson property of groups and proved it for some types of groups.

Later Howson concentrated on mathematics education and participated in reforms of mathematics education in the Great Britain and internationally. He was the editor-in-chief and chairman of Trustees of the School Mathematics Project in Great Britain and was involved in many other national and international projects:

- 1972 he participated in the 2nd International Congress on Mathematical Education held in Exeter and edited Developments in Mathematical Education, the proceedings of that Congress.

Howson worked at University of Southampton as head of the Department of Mathematics and Dean of the Faculty of Mathematical Studies. In 1988 he served as president of the Mathematical Association, and two terms as Secretary of the International Commission on Mathematical Instruction.

Howson died on 1 November 2022, aged 91.
