= Howson property =

Mathematical property

In the mathematical subject of group theory, the Howson property, also known as the finitely generated intersection property (FGIP), is the property of a group saying that the intersection of any two finitely generated subgroups of this group is again finitely generated. The property is named after Albert G. Howson who in a 1954 paper established that free groups have this property.

== Formal definition ==
A group $G$ is said to have the Howson property if for every finitely generated subgroups $H,K$ of $G$ their intersection $H\cap K$ is again a finitely generated subgroup of $G$.

== Examples and non-examples ==
- Every finite group has the Howson property.
- The group $G=F(a,b)\times \mathbb Z$ does not have the Howson property. Specifically, if $t$ is the generator of the $\mathbb Z$ factor of $G$, then for $H=F(a,b)$ and $K=\langle a,tb\rangle \le G$, one has $H\cap K=\operatorname{ncl}_{F(a,b)}(a)$. Therefore, $H\cap K$ is not finitely generated.
- If $\Sigma$ is a compact surface then the fundamental group $\pi_1(\Sigma)$ of $\Sigma$ has the Howson property.
- A free-by-(infinite cyclic group) $F_n\rtimes \mathbb Z$, where $n\ge 2$, never has the Howson property.
- In view of the recent proof of the Virtually Haken conjecture and the Virtually fibered conjecture for 3-manifolds, previously established results imply that if M is a closed hyperbolic 3-manifold then $\pi_1(M)$ does not have the Howson property.
- Among 3-manifold groups, there are many examples that do and do not have the Howson property. 3-manifold groups with the Howson property include fundamental groups of hyperbolic 3-manifolds of infinite volume, 3-manifold groups based on Sol and Nil geometries, as well as 3-manifold groups obtained by some connected sum and JSJ decomposition constructions.
- For every $n\ge 1$ the Baumslag–Solitar group $BS(1,n)=\langle a,t\mid t^{-1}at=a^n\rangle$ has the Howson property.
- If G is group where every finitely generated subgroup is Noetherian then G has the Howson property. In particular, all abelian groups and all nilpotent groups have the Howson property.
- Every polycyclic-by-finite group has the Howson property.
- If $A,B$ are groups with the Howson property then their free product $A\ast B$ also has the Howson property. More generally, the Howson property is preserved under taking amalgamated free products and HNN-extension of groups with the Howson property over finite subgroups.
- In general, the Howson property is rather sensitive to amalgamated products and HNN extensions over infinite subgroups. In particular, for free groups $F,F'$ and an infinite cyclic group $C$, the amalgamated free product $F\ast_C F'$ has the Howson property if and only if $C$ is a maximal cyclic subgroup in both $F$ and $F'$.
- A right-angled Artin group $A(\Gamma)$ has the Howson property if and only if every connected component of $\Gamma$ is a complete graph.
- Limit groups have the Howson property.
- It is not known whether $SL(3,\mathbb Z)$ has the Howson property.
- For $n\ge 4$ the group $SL(n,\mathbb Z)$ contains a subgroup isomorphic to $F(a,b)\times F(a,b)$ and does not have the Howson property.
- Many small cancellation groups and Coxeter groups, satisfying the "perimeter reduction" condition on their presentation, are locally quasiconvex word-hyperbolic groups and therefore have the Howson property.
- One-relator groups $G=\langle x_1,\dots, x_k \mid r^n=1\rangle$, where $n\ge |r|$ are also locally quasiconvex word-hyperbolic groups and therefore have the Howson property.
- The Grigorchuk group G of intermediate growth does not have the Howson property.
- The Howson property is not a first-order property, that is the Howson property cannot be characterized by a collection of first order group language formulas.
- A free pro-p group $F$ satisfies a topological version of the Howson property: If $H,K$ are topologically finitely generated closed subgroups of $F$ then their intersection $H\cap K$ is topologically finitely generated.
- For any fixed integers $m\ge 2,n\ge 1,d\ge 1,$ a ``generic" $m$-generator $n$-relator group $G=\langle x_1,\dots x_m|r_1,\dots, r_n\rangle$ has the property that for any $d$-generated subgroups $H,K\le G$ their intersection $H\cap K$ is again finitely generated.
- The wreath product $\mathbb Z\ wr\ \mathbb Z$ does not have the Howson property.
- Thompson's group $F$ does not have the Howson property, since it contains $\mathbb Z\ wr\ \mathbb Z$.

== See also ==
- Hanna Neumann conjecture
