= Angelo Frattini =

Italian sculptor

- Born: 10 November 1910; Varese, Italy
- Died: 2 September 1975 (aged 64)
- Education: Brera Academy
- Known for: Sculptor

Angelo Frattini (10 November 1910 – 2 September 1975) was an Italian sculptor from Varese. He studied at Brera Academy and his first contacts with sculptural art were influenced by Scapigliatura's teachings. He also exhibited his works in New York City and Washington DC, where he was received by president Lyndon Johnson. Angelo Frattini died in Varese on September 2, 1975. In 1978 the artistic lyceum of his hometown was named after him.

== Life ==
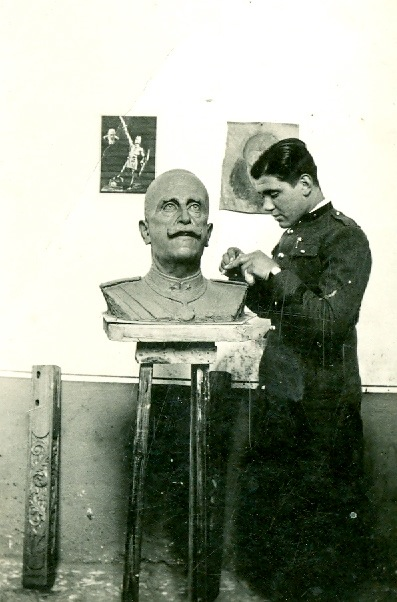
Angelo Frattini sculpturing a bust of Umberto II of Savoia

Born in Varese on November 10, 1910, Angelo Frattini became an orphan at the age of 9. His artistic formation took place initially in Naples and subsequently in Milan. Frattini served his Italian military service in Naples, where he attended Giovanni De Martino's evening classes and got to know Gemito's sculpture. In Naples he also frequented the Galleria d’Arte Moderna and the National Archeological Museum. For most of his youth he was self-taught, and was influenced by late Nineteenth Century art.

In 1925 he was a student at Giuseppe Motta's evening class, and with his friend Flaminio Bertoni he carved some small low reliefs at Campo dei Fiori. When he went back to Milan in 1931, he studied at the Artistic Lyceum and then at the Academy of Brera, where he attended Francesco Messina's class. Varese was the background-city for his artistic growth from the 1930s. In 1934 he married Maria Gervasini, who, one year later, gave birth to their first son, Gianluigi. His first contact with the art of sculpture follows Giuseppe Grandi and the Scapigliatura teachings. He shared his contemporaneity with friends who were poets, writers, painters, sculptors and actors such as Piero Chiara, Vittorio Sereni, Giuseppe Montanari, Aldo Patocchi, Luciano Ferriani, Paolo Conti, Aldo Carpi, Renato Guttuso and Gianni Santuccio. Widowed in 1953, in 1961 he married Magda Lazzari, mother of his third daughter, born in 1963. Angelo Frattini died in Varese, while the first anthological exhibition at Villa Mirabello was getting prepared.

== Awards ==
In 1937 he received several awards: he won I Littoriali for the sculpture in Rome, at the Campidoglio was rewarded for the Orfana, work bought by the Galleria d’Arte Moderna of Milan, and won the contest to make the big relief on the palace of Corporation in Piazza Monte Grappa in Varese. In 1937 was also born his second son, Vittore, who subsequently followed his father's steps in becoming an artist. In the same year Frattini received the I Premio of sculpture award in Naples, and in Milan in 1954 he received the I Premio awards for portraits. In 1965 Frattini was the artistic spokesperson for Italy in New York and in Washington, where he was received by the President of the United States Lyndon Johnson, in the collective "Mostra degli artisti italiani".

== Exhibitions ==
In 1938 he held a major exhibition at the Galleria Ferrari of Milan, reference point for his whole career, and at the Biennale Internazionale d’Arte of Venice. He held further exhibitions in Venice in 1940 and in 1942. In 1946 he sculptured the portrait of King Umberto II di Savoia. He also boasted major exhibitions of his work at the Permanente of Milan and at other national exhibitions such as the Quadriennale d’Arte of Torino in 1955 and the Quadriennale of Rome the following year. In 1978 the artistic lyceum of Varese was named after him. The city of Varese has held several exhibitions to commemorate Frattini's life and works, including a homage by the Provincia di Varese in 1999. These include:

- in 1999, a retrospective of him at Villa Recalcati, headquarters of the Provincia di Varese;
- in 2010, an exhibition at the Museo Bertoni;
- in 2010, a centenary exhibition at Sala Veratti, to celebrate the centenary of his birth.

== Works ==
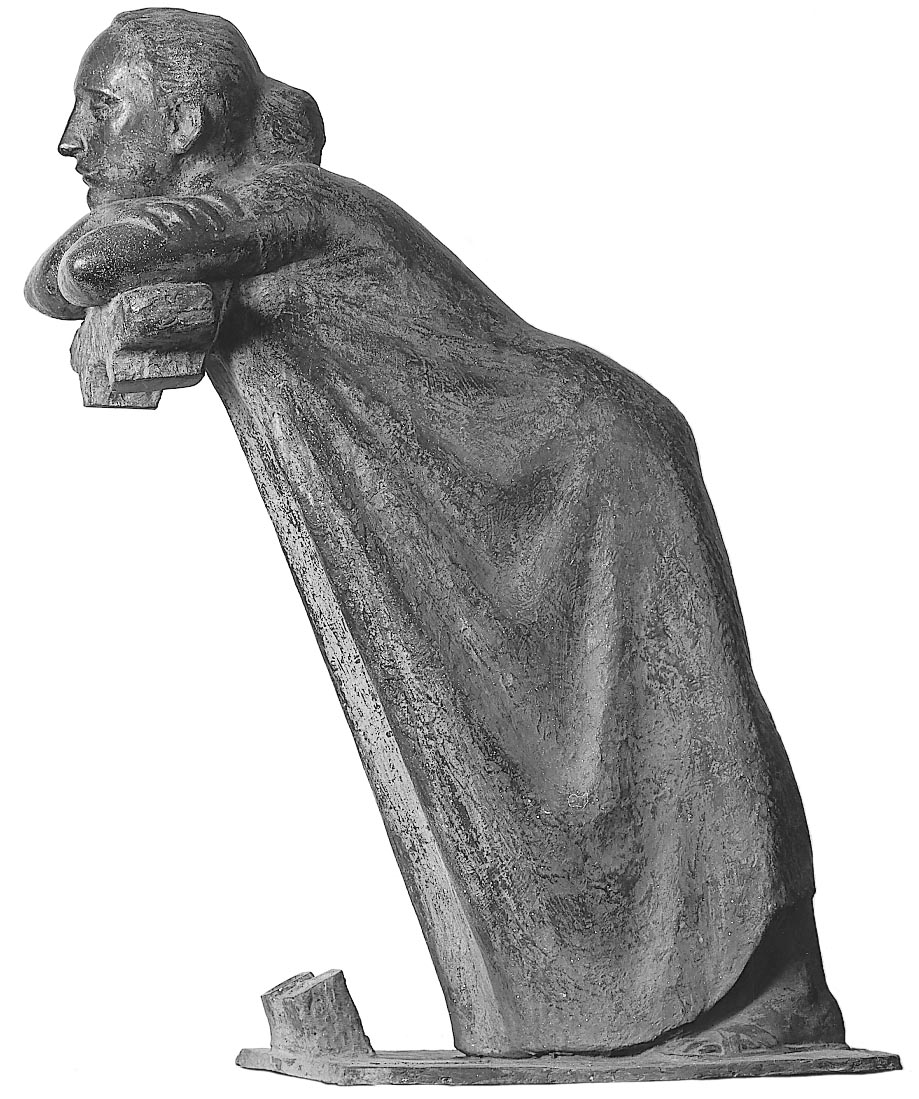
La Duplice Attesa, 1962. This work, called "The Double Waiting", represents the artist's wife waiting for his husband to come back home and for her daughter to be born.

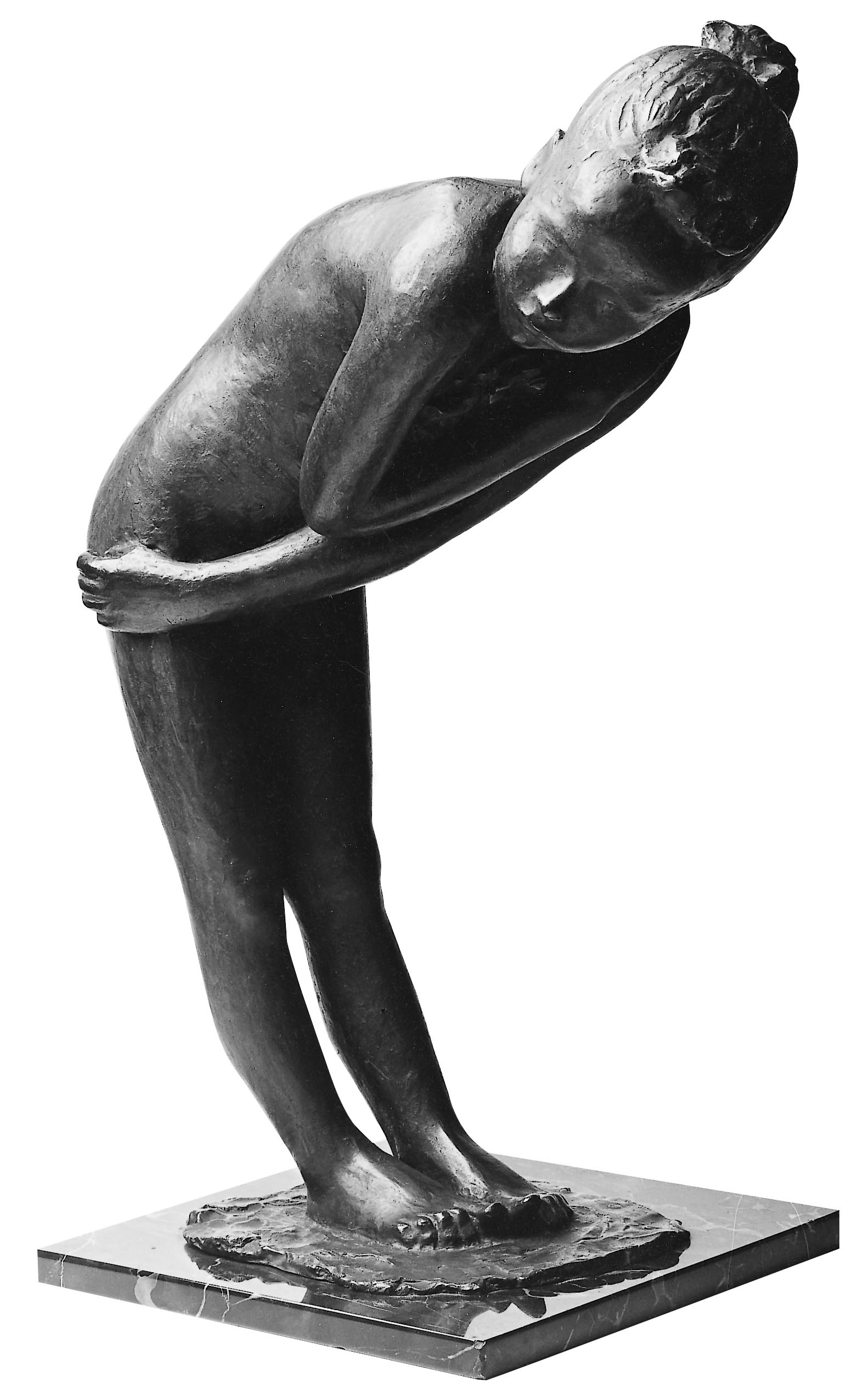
Angelo Frattini's sculpture

== Bibliography ==
- L. Gallina, Sculture di Frattini, La Nuova Sfera Editrice Milano, Milan 1980.
- D. Ferrari, Angelo Frattini e il suo tempo, Fidia Edizioni d’Arte, Lugano 1999. ISBN 978-8-872-69081-9
- M. Conconi, Angelo Frattini, l’Artista, l’Artistico e la sua città, Edizioni Arterigere, Varese 2010. ISBN 978-8-889-66653-1
