= Stephanie van Willigenburg =

Canadian mathematician

Stephanie van Willigenburg is a professor of mathematics at the University of British Columbia whose research is in the field of algebraic combinatorics and concerns quasisymmetric functions. Together with James Haglund, Kurt Luoto and Sarah Mason, she introduced the quasisymmetric Schur functions, which form a basis for quasisymmetric functions.

== Education ==
Van Willigenburg earned her Ph.D. in 1997 at the University of St. Andrews under the joint supervision of Edmund F. Robertson and Michael D. Atkinson, with a thesis titled The Descent Algebras of Coxeter Groups.

== Recognition ==
Van Willigenburg was awarded the Krieger–Nelson Prize in 2017 by the Canadian Mathematical Society. She was named to the 2023 class of Fellows of the American Mathematical Society, "for contributions to algebraic combinatorics, mentorship and exposition, and inclusive community building".

== Selected publications ==
- Bergeron, Nantel; Mykytiuk, Stefan; Sottile, Frank; van Willigenburg, Stephanie (July 2000), "Noncommutative Pieri operators on posets", Journal of Combinatorial Theory, Series A, 91 (1–2): 84–110, arXiv:math/0002073, doi:10.1006/jcta.2000.3090
- Billera, Louis J.; Hsiao, Samuel K.; van Willigenburg, Stephanie (25 June 2003), "Peak quasisymmetric functions and Eulerian enumeration", Advances in Mathematics, 176 (2): 248–276, arXiv:0706.3486, doi:10.1016/S0001-8708(02)00067-1
- Haglund, James; Luoto, Kurt; Mason, Sarah; van Willigenburg, Stephanie (2011a), "Quasisymmetric Schur functions", Journal of Combinatorial Theory, Series A, 118 (2): 463–490, arXiv:0810.2489, doi:10.1016/j.jcta.2009.11.002
- Haglund, James; Luoto, Kurt; Mason, Sarah; van Willigenburg, Stephanie (2011b), "Refinements of the Littlewood-Richardson rule", Transactions of the American Mathematical Society, 363 (3): 1665–1686, arXiv:0908.3540, doi:10.1090/S0002-9947-2010-05244-4
