= Frattini's argument =

In group theory, a branch of mathematics, Frattini's argument is an important lemma in the structure theory of finite groups. It is named after Giovanni Frattini, who used it in a paper from 1885 when defining the Frattini subgroup of a group. The argument was taken by Frattini, as he himself admits, from a paper of Alfredo Capelli dated 1884.

== Frattini's argument ==
=== Statement ===
If $G$ is a finite group with normal subgroup $H$, and if $P$ is a Sylow p-subgroup of $H$, then

$$G = N_G(P)H,$$

where $N_G(P)$ denotes the normalizer of $P$ in $G$, and $N_G(P)H$ means the product of group subsets.

=== Proof ===
The group $P$ is a Sylow $p$-subgroup of $H$, so every Sylow $p$-subgroup of $H$ is an $H$-conjugate of $P$, that is, it is of the form $h^{-1}Ph$ for some $h \in H$ (see Sylow theorems). Let $g$ be any element of $G$. Since $H$ is normal in $G$, the subgroup $g^{-1}Pg$ is contained in $H$. This means that $g^{-1}Pg$ is a Sylow $p$-subgroup of $H$. Then, by the above, it must be $H$-conjugate to $P$: that is, for some $h \in H$

$$g^{-1}Pg = h^{-1}Ph,$$

and so

$$hg^{-1}Pgh^{-1} = P.$$

Thus

$$gh^{-1} \in N_G(P),$$

and therefore $g \in N_G(P)H$. But $g \in G$ was arbitrary, and so $G = HN_G(P) = N_G(P)H.\ \square$

== Applications ==
- Frattini's argument can be used as part of a proof that any finite nilpotent group is a direct product of its Sylow subgroups.
- By applying Frattini's argument to $N_G(N_G(P))$, it can be shown that $N_G(N_G(P)) = N_G(P)$ whenever $G$ is a finite group and $P$ is a Sylow $p$-subgroup of $G$.
- More generally, if a subgroup $M \leq G$ contains $N_G(P)$ for some Sylow $p$-subgroup $P$ of $G$, then $M$ is self-normalizing, i.e. $M = N_G(M)$.
