= Walter Neumann =

British-American mathematician (1946–2024)

Walter D. Neumann
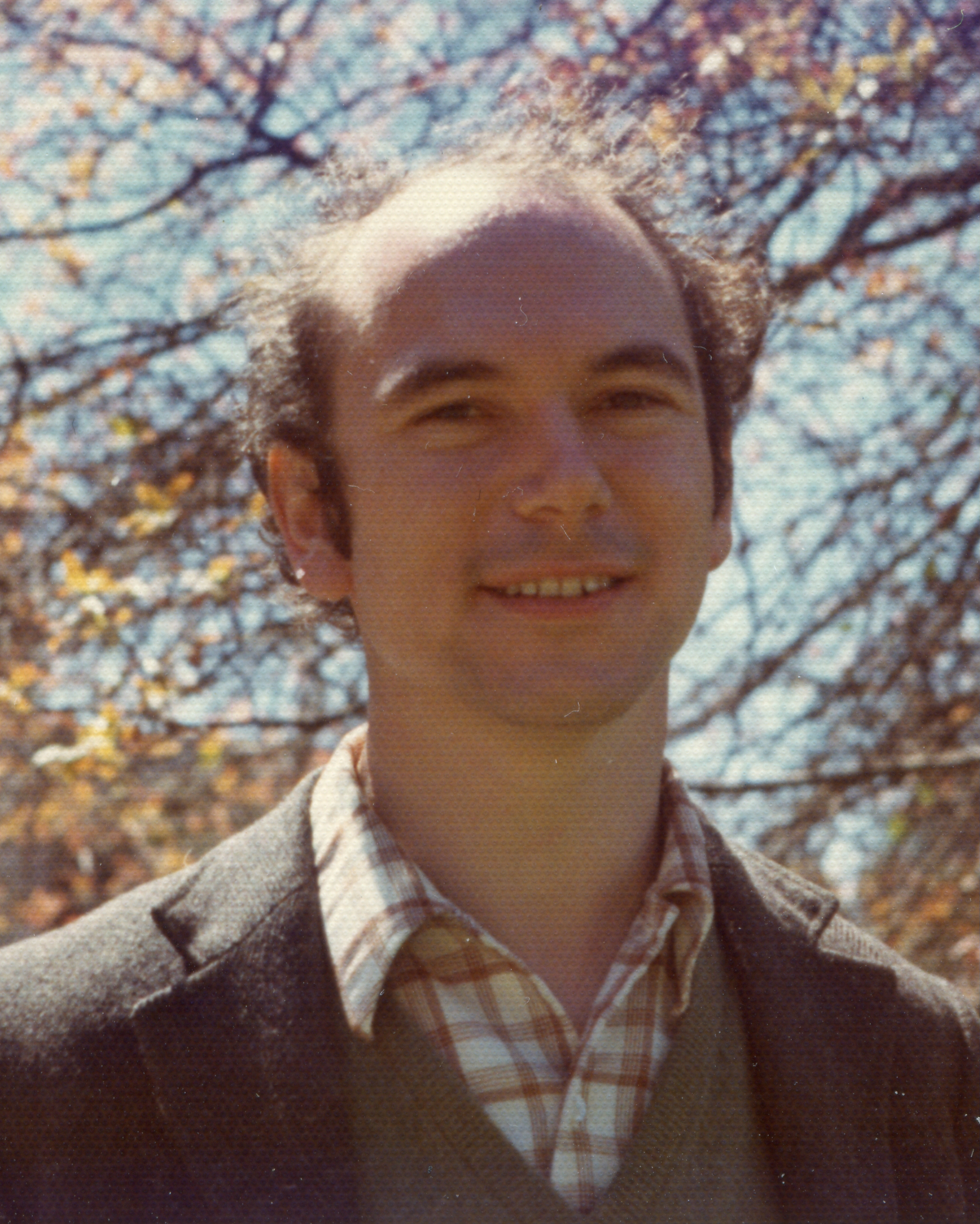
- Neumann in 1973
- Born: January 1, 1946; Caerphilly, Wales
- Died: September 24, 2024 (aged 78)
- Spouse: Anne Neumann
- Parent(s): Bernhard Neumann; Hanna Neumann
- Relatives: Peter M. Neumann

Academic background
- Education: University of Bonn
- Thesis: S^{1}-Actions and the Alpha-Invariant of the Involutions; Mathematics Subject Classification: 57—Manifolds and cell complexes (1969)
- Doctoral advisor: Friedrich Hirzebruch; Klaus Jänich

Academic work
- Discipline: Mathematics
- Sub-discipline: Geometric group theory

Walter David Neumann (1 January 1946 – 24 September 2024) was a British-American mathematician who worked in topology, geometric group theory, and singularity theory. He was a professor at Barnard College, Columbia University. Neumann obtained his Ph.D. under the joint supervision of Friedrich Hirzebruch and Klaus Jänich at the University of Bonn in 1969.

He was a son of the mathematicians Bernhard Neumann and Hanna Neumann. His brother Peter M. Neumann was also a mathematician.

Walter Neumann was elected a member of the European Academy of Sciences in 2002. He was in the Inaugural Class of Fellows of the American Mathematical Society, starting from 2013.

Neumann died on 24 September 2024, at the age of 78.
