= Giuseppe Battaglini =

Italian mathematician (1826–1894)

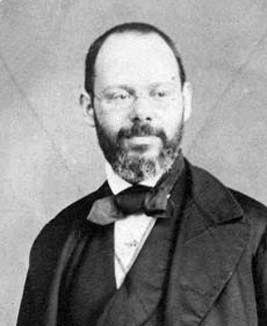
- Born: 11 January 1826; Naples, Kingdom of Naples and Sicily
- Died: 29 April 1894 (aged 68); Naples, Italy
- Education: Scuola d'Applicazione di Ponti e Strade of Naples (diploma, 1848)
- Scientific career
- Fields: Mathematics
- Workplaces: University of Naples
- Doctoral students: Alfredo Capelli; Giovanni Frattini

Giuseppe Battaglini (11 January 1826 – 29 April 1894) was an Italian mathematician.

He studied mathematics at the Scuola d'Applicazione di Ponti e Strade (School of Bridges and Roads) of Naples. In 1860 he was appointed professor of Geometria superiore at the University of Naples. Alfredo Capelli and Giovanni Frattini were his Laurea students.

== See also ==
- 8155 Battaglini
