= Giovanni Frattini =

Italian mathematician (1852–1925)

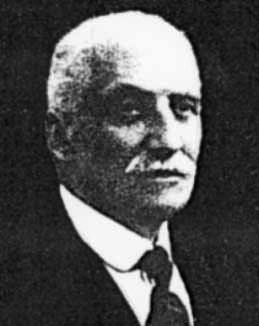
- Born: 8 January 1852; Rome, Papal States
- Died: 21 July 1925 (aged 73); Rome, Italy
- Education: Sapienza University of Rome
- Known for: Frattini subgroup Frattini's argument
- Awards: ICM Speaker (1908)
- Scientific career
- Fields: Mathematics
- Doctoral advisor: Giuseppe Battaglini; Eugenio Beltrami

Giovanni Frattini (8 January 1852 – 21 July 1925) was an Italian mathematician, noted for his contributions to group theory.

== Biography ==
Frattini entered the University of Rome in 1869, where he studied mathematics with Giuseppe Battaglini, Eugenio Beltrami, and Luigi Cremona, obtaining his Laurea in 1875.

In 1885 he published a paper where he defined a certain subgroup of a finite group. This subgroup, now known as the Frattini subgroup, is the subgroup $\Phi(G)$ generated by all the non-generators of the group $G$. He showed that $\Phi(G)$ is nilpotent and, in so doing, developed a method of proof known today as Frattini's argument.

Besides group theory, he also studied differential geometry and the analysis of second degree indeterminates.
