= Hanna Neumann =

German-born mathematician (1914–1971)

Johanna (Hanna) Neumann
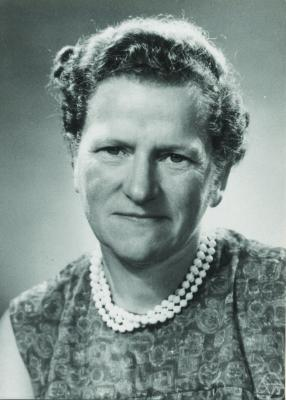
- Born: Johanna von Caemmerer; 12 February 1914; Lankwitz, Steglitz-Zehlendorf, Germany
- Died: 14 November 1971 (aged 57); Ottawa, Ontario, Canada
- Citizenship: British, Australian
- Education: University of Berlin, University of Göttingen, University of Oxford
- Known for: Group theory
- Spouse: Bernhard Neumann
- Children: Peter M. Neumann, Walter Neumann, Irene Neumann, Daniel Neumann, Barbara Neumann
- Awards: Fellowship of the Australian Academy of Science (1969), Fellowship of the Australian College of Educators (1970).
- Scientific career
- Fields: Mathematics
- Workplaces: University of Hull, School of Mathematics, University of Manchester, Australian National University
- Thesis: Sub-group Structure of Free Products of Groups with an Amalgamated Subgroup
- Doctoral advisor: Olga Taussky-Todd

Johanna "Hanna" Neumann (née von Caemmerer; 12 February 1914 – 14 November 1971) was a German-born mathematician who worked on group theory.

== Biography ==
Neumann was born on 12 February 1914 in Lankwitz, Steglitz-Zehlendorf (today a district of Berlin), Germany. She was the youngest of three children of Hermann and Katharina von Caemmerer. As a result of her father's death in the first days of the First World War, the family income was small, and from the age of thirteen she was coaching school children.

After two years at a private school she entered the Auguste-Viktoria-Schule, a girls' grammar school (Realgymnasium), in 1922. She graduated in early 1932 and then entered the University of Berlin. The lecture courses in mathematics that she took in her first year were: Introduction to Higher Mathematics given by Georg Feigl; Analytical Geometry and Projective Geometry both given by Ludwig Bieberbach, Differential and Integral Calculus given by Erhard Schmidt, and the Theory of Numbers given by Friedrich Schur. She also took formal courses in physics, and attended lectures in psychology, literature and law. As a result of her first year work, Hanna was awarded three-quarters' remission of fees and a position as a part-time assistant in the Mathematical Institute's library.

A friendship between Hanna and Bernhard Neumann began in January 1933. In March 1933, the Nazis came to power and in August 1933, Bernhard, who was Jewish, moved to Cambridge, England. She visited Bernhard in London at Easter 1934 and they became secretly engaged. After this she returned to Germany to continue her studies.

In her second year Neumann was part of a group of students who tried to prevent Nazi disruption of Jewish academics' lectures by ensuring that only genuine students attended. She lost her job in the Mathematical Institute, presumably as a result of such activities. However she had by then been awarded, and continued to earn for the rest of her course, full remission of fees.

In the remainder of her undergraduate degree, she studied mathematics, physics and philosophy. She completed her studies in 1936 with distinctions in the Staatsexamen in mathematics and physics. She began studying for her Ph.D. at the University of Göttingen in 1937, under the supervision of Helmut Hasse.

During this time Bernhard and Hanna corresponded anonymously through friends, and were only able to meet once, in Denmark in 1936 when Bernhard was travelling to the International Congress of Mathematicians in Oslo. In July 1938, Hanna moved to England. She married Bernhard in December 1938 in Cardiff. They went on to have five children. The Neumanns moved to Oxford in 1940.

Neumann completed her D Phil. in group theory at the Society of Oxford Home-Students in 1944 under Olga Taussky-Todd. Her thesis was entitled 'Sub-group Structure of Free Products of Groups with an Amalgamated Subgroup'. The University of Oxford later awarded her a D.Sc. for her publications.

Following her naturalisation as a British citizen, she took a teaching position at the University of Hull in 1946. From 1958 she took up a lecturing post at the Mathematics Department of Manchester College of Science and Technology (later to become UMIST). In 1961-1962 the Neumanns spent a year at the Courant Institute of Mathematical Sciences.

The Neumanns moved to Australia in August 1963 to take academic positions at the Australian National University in Canberra. She was made chair of pure mathematics in 1964 and was dean of students between 1968 and 1969.

She died from a cerebral aneurysm while on a lecture tour in Ottawa, Ontario. A building at the Australian National University was named in her honour in 1973. Four of her five children became mathematicians including Peter M. Neumann and Walter Neumann.

== Research and publications ==
Her most widely known work "Varieties of Groups" was published in 1967. It has been translated into Russian. She published 34 articles, most in international journals.

Hanna and her husband are known for the Higman-Neumann-Neumann construction in group theory, and the Hanna Neumann conjecture is named after her.

== Teaching and supervision ==
At the time of her appointment, the Department at ANU had recently started an honours programme in mathematics and were looking for a relatively senior pure mathematician to be responsible for that aspect of the courses. Neumann

began organizing courses which would show the students something of mathematics as she saw it. She was able to introduce into the first year course, which had till then been entirely problem-oriented, a small strand of one lecture a week of an introduction to mathematics in the style of Feigl-Rohrbach. The later-year algebra courses much more thoroughly reflected her own interests and views. She continued to develop a style of teaching which aimed at making the acquisition of very abstract ideas accessible through judicious use of more concrete examples and well-graded exercises.

Hanna supervised 10 doctoral students and has 51 descendants.

== Recognition ==
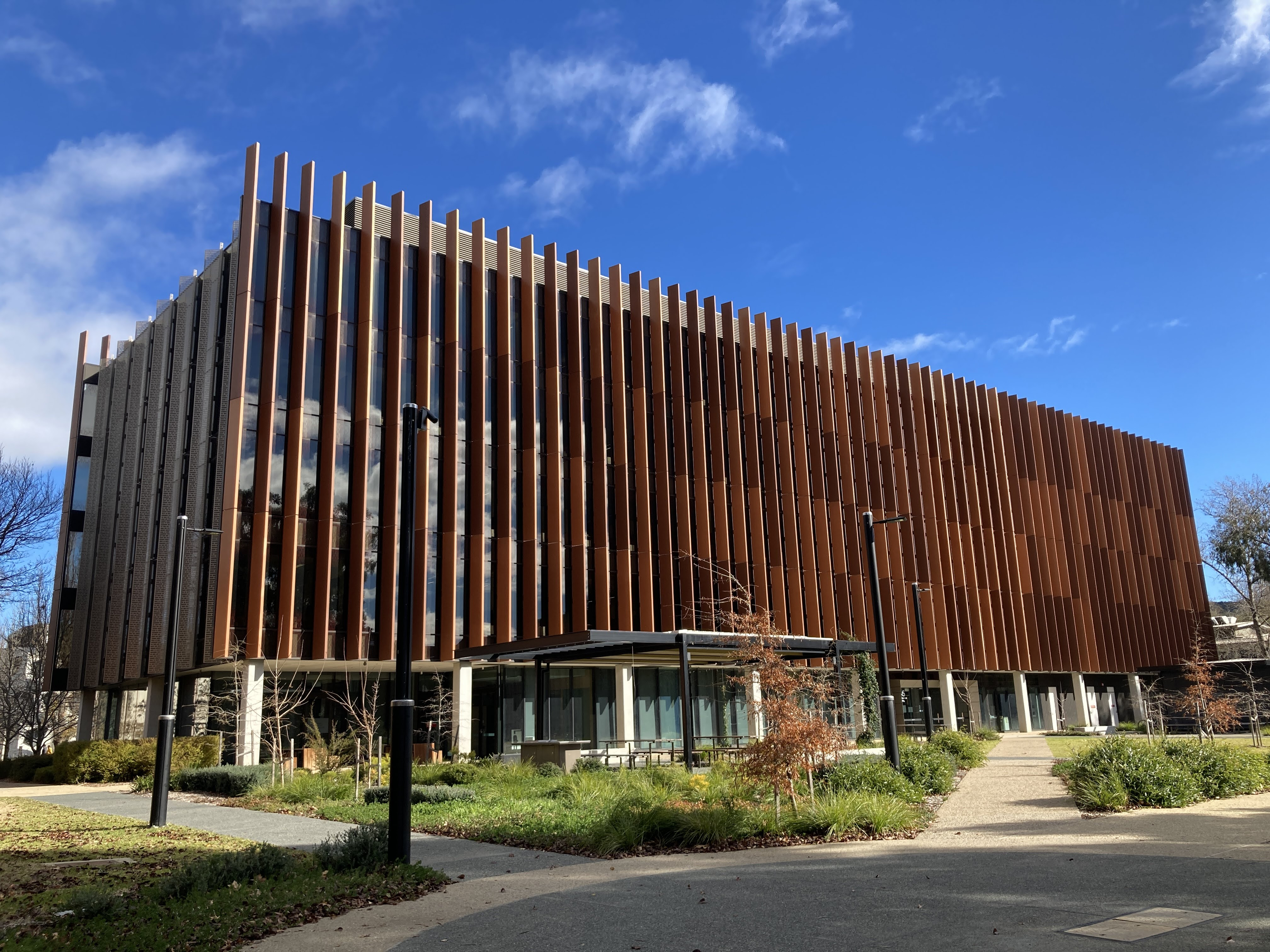
The Hanna Neumann Building at the ANU in 2024

- Fellow of the Australian Academy of Science, elected in 1969.
- Fellow of the Australian College of Educators, elected in 1970.
- The old and new buildings associated to the Mathematical Sciences Institute at the Australian National University have been named after her.
- Neumann Place in the Canberra suburb of Florey is named in her honour.
- In 2010, the Australian Mathematical Society began hosting a lecture series named after her, celebrating women's achievements in mathematics.

== See also ==
- Hanna Neumann conjecture
- HNN extension
