= Peter M. Neumann =

British mathematician (1940–2020)

Peter M. Neumann OBE
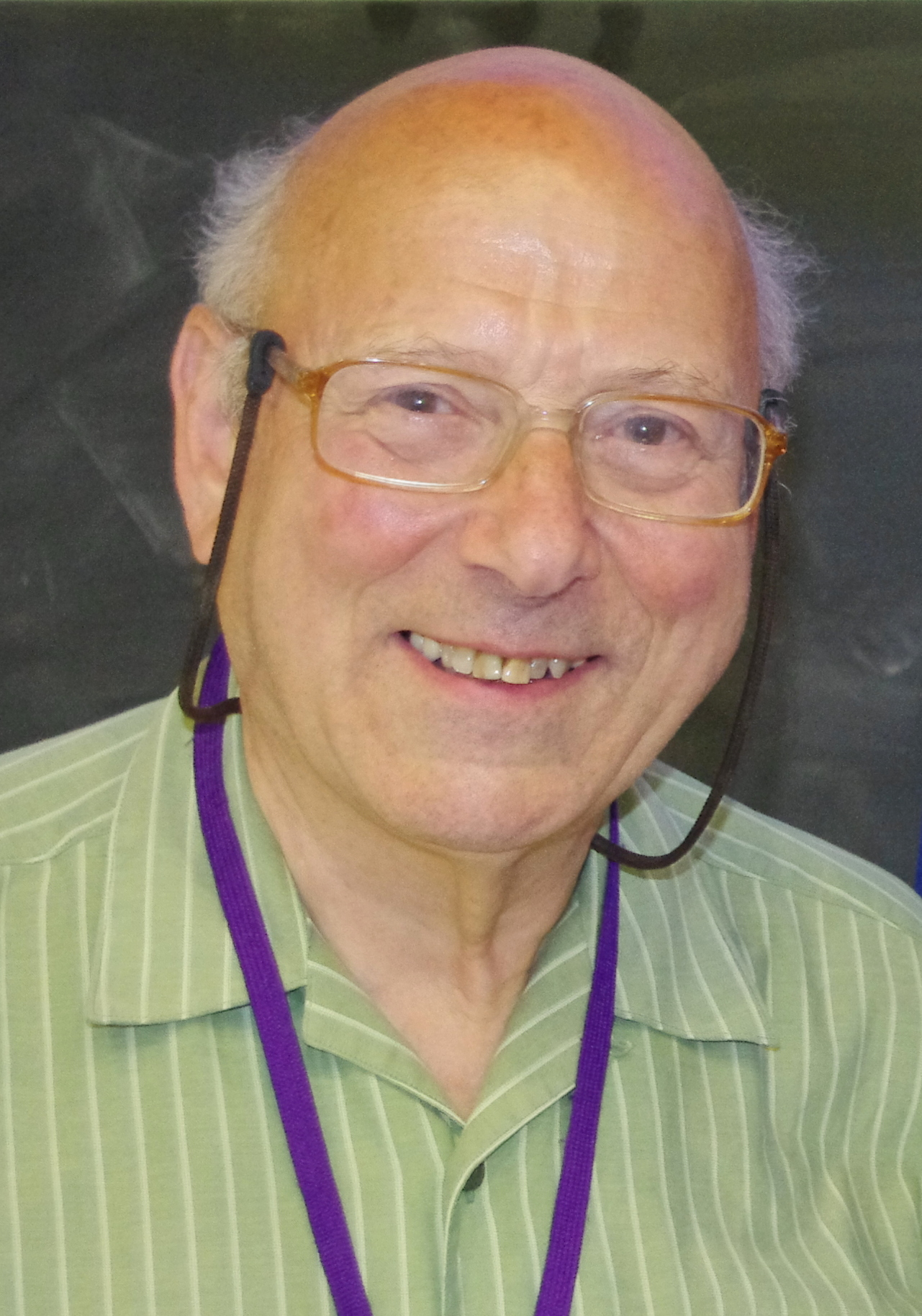
- Neumann in 2008
- Born: Peter Michael Neumann; 28 December 1940; Oxford, England
- Died: 18 December 2020 (aged 79); Oxford, England
- Education: University of Oxford (BA, DPhil)
- Awards: Senior Whitehead Prize (2003) David Crighton Medal (2012)
- Scientific career
- Fields: Algebra
- Institutions: University of Oxford
- Doctoral advisor: Graham Higman
- Doctoral students: Michael D. Atkinson; Peter Cameron; Catherine Greenhill; Annabelle McIver; Colin McNab; Cheryl Praeger
- Website: www.maths.ox.ac.uk

Peter Michael Neumann OBE (28 December 1940 – 18 December 2020) was a British mathematician. His fields of interest included the history of mathematics and Galois theory.

== Biography ==
Born in December 1940, Neumann was a son of the German-born mathematicians Bernhard Neumann and Hanna Neumann. He gained a BA degree from The Queen's College, Oxford in 1963, and a DPhil degree from the University of Oxford in 1966. On completing his doctorate, Neumann was named a Tutorial Fellow at the Queen's College, Oxford, and in 1967 he became a lecturer at the University of Oxford. His research work was in the field of group theory. In 1987, Neumann won the Lester R. Ford Award of the Mathematical Association of America for his review of Harold Edwards' book Galois Theory.

He was the first Chairman of the United Kingdom Mathematics Trust, from October 1996 to April 2004, succeeded by Bernard Silverman.

Neumann showed in 1997 that Alhazen's problem (reflecting a light ray off a spherical mirror to hit a target) cannot be solved with a straightedge and compass construction. Although the solution is a straightforward application of Galois theory it settles the constructibility of one of the last remaining geometric construction problems posed in antiquity.

In 2003, the London Mathematical Society awarded him the Senior Whitehead Prize. He was appointed Officer of the Order of the British Empire (OBE) in the 2008 New Year Honours.

After retiring in 2008, he became an Emeritus Fellow at the Queen's College.

Neumann's work in the history of mathematics includes his 2011 publication The Mathematical Writings of Évariste Galois, an English language book on the work of French mathematician Évariste Galois (1811–1832). Neumann was a long-standing supporter of the British Society for the History of Mathematics, whose Neumann Prize is named in his honour.

Neumann was the president of the Mathematical Association from 2015 to 2016.

Neumann died from COVID-19 on 18 December 2020, ten days before his 80th birthday, during the COVID-19 pandemic in the United Kingdom.

== Personal life ==
Neumann married Sylvia Bull in 1962. She was a fellow mathematics undergraduate at Oxford, where they met.
