= Alfredo Capelli =

Italian mathematician (1855–1910)

- Born: 5 August 1855; Milan, Italy
- Died: 28 January 1910 (aged 54); Naples, Italy
- Education: University of Rome
- Known for: Capelli's identity Rouché–Capelli theorem
- Scientific career
- Fields: Mathematics
- Workplaces: University of Pavia; University of Palermo; University of Naples
- Doctoral advisor: Giuseppe Battaglini

Alfredo Capelli (5 August 1855 – 28 January 1910) was an Italian mathematician who discovered Capelli's identity.

== Biography ==
Capelli earned his Laurea from the University of Rome in 1877 under Giuseppe Battaglini, and moved to the University of Pavia where he worked as an assistant for Felice Casorati. In 1881 he became the professor of Algebraic Analysis at the University of Palermo, replacing Cesare Arzelà who had recently moved to Bologna. In 1886, he moved again to the University of Naples, where he held the chair in algebra. He remained at Naples until his death in 1910. As well as being professor there, Capelli was editor of the Giornale di Matematiche di Battaglini from 1894 to 1910, and was elected to the Accademia dei Lincei.

== Selected publications ==
- Capelli, Alfredo (1887), "Ueber die Zurückführung der Cayley'schen Operation Ω auf gewöhnliche Polar-Operationen", Mathematische Annalen, 29 (3), Berlin / Heidelberg: Springer: 331–338, doi:10.1007/BF01447728, ISSN 1432-1807, S2CID 120260817
