= Giuseppe Montanari =

Italian painter (1889–1976)

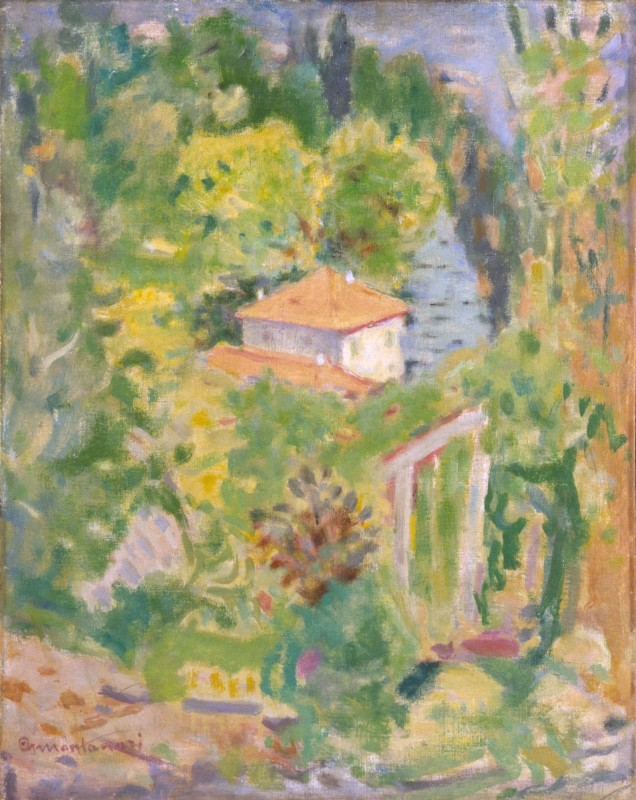
Casa nel bosco, c. 1950 (Fondazione Cariplo)

Giuseppe Montanari (1889–1976) was an Italian painter associated with the Novecento Italiano movement.

== Biography ==
Montanari was born in Osimo, Italy. He moved to Milan in 1906 and studied at the Brera Academy. He moved to Varese after World War I. The influence of Ubaldo Oppi and Felice Casorati led him to simplify his volumes and endow them with greater solidity in the 1920s. He joined the Novecento Italiano movement and took part in their first and second shows (Milan, 1926 and 1929). His participation in the Venice Biennale began by invitation in 1924 with the 14th Esposizione Internazionale d'Arte della Città di Venezia. His subject matter was drawn from regional folklore in this period and his painting of fishermen (Pescatori) was bought by the Galleria d'Arte Moderna, Milan, in 1930. The classical and monumental character of the large compositions contrasts with the naturalism of the sketches and family portraits. During the first part of the 1930s, Montanari frescoed part of the Casa del Fascio in Varese. He came under the influence of the Milanese Chiarismo movement in the second half of the 1930s and made frequent stays in the Marche and Liguria regions after World War II. He died in Varese in 1976.

== Other projects ==
Media related to Giuseppe Montanari at Wikimedia Commons
