= Bernhard Neumann =

German-born British mathematician (1909–2002)

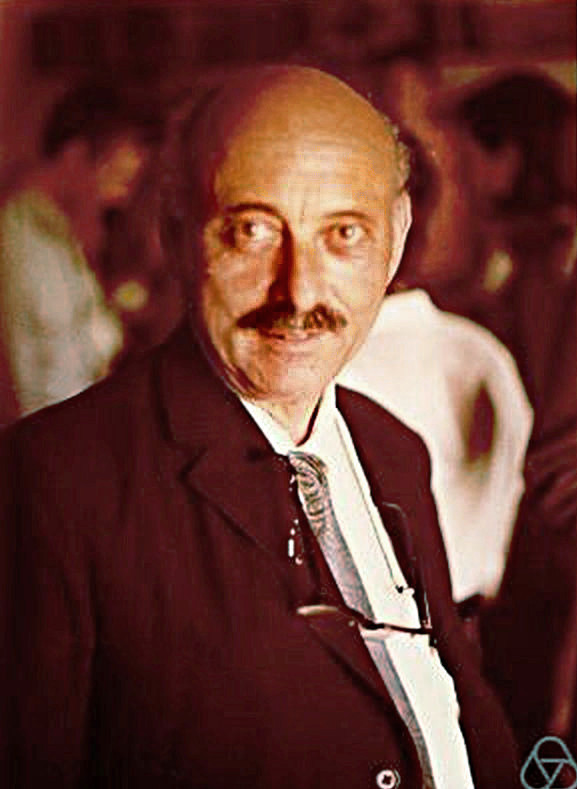
- Born: 15 October 1909; Berlin, Germany
- Died: 20 October 2002 (aged 93); Canberra, Australia
- Education: University of Berlin; University of Cambridge
- Known for: Petr–Douglas–Neumann theorem Hahn–Mal'cev–Neumann series HNN extension Outer billiard Absolute presentation of a group
- Awards: Adams Prize (1952)
- Scientific career
- Fields: Mathematics
- Workplaces: Australian National University; University of Manchester
- Doctoral advisor: Issai Schur (Berlin); Philip Hall (Cambridge)
- Doctoral students: Gilbert Baumslag; John Britton; James Wiegold

Bernhard Hermann Neumann AC, FRS (15 October 1909 – 21 October 2002) was a German-born British-Australian mathematician, who was a leader in the study of group theory.

== Early life and education ==
Bernhard Hermann Neumann was born in Berlin, Germany, on 15 October 1909, the second child and only son of middle-class Jewish parents. His father, Richard Newumann, worked for AEG.

He attended Herderschule in Berlin-Charlottenburg from 1916 to 1928. He loved mathematics at school, and in year 10, invented his own form of three-dimensional analytic geometry. He was taught by Felix W. Behrend, whose son Felix A. Behrend became a lifelong friend, and was appointed associate professor of mathematics at the University of Melbourne.

After school, in 1928-29 he spent two semesters at the University of Freiburg. After his favourite teacher there died, Neumann returned to Berlin and enrolled at the Friedrich-Wilhelms-Universität Berlin, which later became Humboldt University. There he studied under Robert Remak, who introduced him to group theory, as well as Erhard Schmidt, Issai Schur, and Heinz Hopf. Neumann began studying physics and philosophy as well as pure mathematics, later dropping the first two. He met his future wife, Hanna von Caemmerer, during this period. In November 1931 he submitted his thesis, and was awarded his doctorate in July 1932. His examiners were Schur and Schmidt. He continued to attend lectures at the university, and worked as an unpaid assistant in the experimental physics laboratory.

After Hitler assumed power and life became difficult for Jewish students, he fled first to Amsterdam, before receiving advice that the University of Cambridge was the best place for mathematicians, so he registered there for a second PhD, with Philip Hall as his supervisor. For this, he studied group theory, and was awarded a PhD by Cambridge in 1935.

== Career ==
After completing his PhD at Cambridge, he remained in Cambridge teaching a preparatory course, but was not offered a job at his level until late 1937, when he was appointed assistant lecturer at University College Cardiff in Cardiff, Wales, for a three-year term, until 1940. Hanna joined him there, and they married.

When World War II started in 1939, Neumann was briefly interned as an enemy alien but was released in 1940. Cardiff University did not request his return, so he joined the Royal Pioneer Corps. He then joined the Royal Artillery then Intelligence Corps. After the end of the war, he did voluntary service in Germany with German Intelligence. He was appointed as a lecturer at University College, Hull, in 1946, where he remained until 1948. His wife joined him on the staff as an assistant lecturer.

In 1948 Neumann was appointed as lecturer in the School of Mathematics, University of Manchester, after being headhunted by English mathematician Max Newman. He and Hanna continued to live in Hull, where Hanna was employed, until she also obtained a post and Manchester University in 1958, and they moved to Manchester. Neumann supervised eight PhD students there, including Gilbert Baumslag, László Kovács, Michael Newman, James Wiegold, and John Britton. He spent his final academic year employed by Manchester University in 1962 on study leave working at the Courant Institute of Mathematical Sciences in New York City. There he wrote a monograph on universal algebra with notes prepared by his son Peter M. Neumann.

Neumann was appointed professor, foundation chair, and head of the Department of Mathematics at the Institute of Advanced Studies at the Australian National University (ANU) in Canberra, so they moved to Australia in 1962. He remained at ANU until his retirement in 1975.

== Other activities ==
Neumann was a senior research fellow at the CSIRO Division of Mathematics and Statistics from 1975 to 1977 and then honorary research fellow from 1978 until his death in 2002.

He supported lent much support to Peter O'Halloran and colleagues in the early days of the Australian Mathematics Competition, and continued his interest in ongoing competitions organised by the Australian Mathematics Trust. He was chair of Australian Mathematical Olympiad Committee from its establishment in 1980 until 1986, and was also involved in the International Mathematical Olympiads. It was largely due to his efforts that the 1988 International Mathematical Olympiad was held in Australia during its bicentennial year.

He was a founding member of the World Cultural Council in 1981.

== Recognition and honours ==
Neumann was an invited speaker of the International Congress of Mathematicians in 1936 at Oslo and in 1970 at Nice.

He was elected a Fellow of the Royal Society in 1959, and a fellow of the Australian Academy of Science in 1963.

The Australian Mathematics Trust commissioned the Sydney portrait artist Judy Cassab to paint Neumann's portrait.

In 1994, he was appointed a Companion of the Order of Australia (AC).

Awards include:

- 1949: Wiskundig Genootschap te Amsterdam Prize
- 1952: Adams Prize, University of Cambridge
- 1984: Matthew Flinders Medal and Lecture

== Personal life ==
In July 1938 Neumann married Hanna in Cardiff. Hanna Neumann as well as the couple's sons, Peter M. Neumann and Walter Neumann, are also notable for their contributions to group theory.

== Death and legacy ==
Neumann died on 21 October 2002 in Canberra.

The group-theoretic notion of HNN (Higman-Neumann-Neumann) extension bears the names of Bernard and his wife Hanna, from their joint paper with Graham Higman.

The BH Neumann Award (B. H. Neumann Award for Excellence in Mathematics Enrichment) has been awarded to one or more recipients by the Australian Maths Trust since 1992. It recognises AMT volunteers "who have made a significant, ongoing and vital contribution to the teaching and learning of mathematical problem-solving in Australia".

The B. H. Neumann Prize has been awarded since 1985 "for the most outstanding talk or talks presented by a student or students" at the Annual Meeting of the Australian Mathematical Society.

== Works ==
- 1937: "Identical relations in groups", Mathematische Annalen 114: 506 to 26
- 1937: "Some remarks on infinite groups", Journal of the London Mathematical Society 12: 120 to 27
- 1949: "On ordered division rings", Transactions of the American Mathematical Society 22: 202 to 52
- 1951: "Embedding non-associative rings in division rings", Proceedings of the London Mathematical Society (3) 1: 241 to 56
- 1954: "An essay on free products of groups with amalgamations", Philosophical Transactions of the Royal Society, Series A 246: 503 to 54
