= Experimental Mathematics (journal) =

- Discipline: Experimental mathematics
- Language: English
- Edited by: Alexander Kasprzyk

Publication details
- History: 1992–present
- Publisher: Taylor & Francis
- Frequency: quarterly
- Impact factor: 0.659 (2019)

Standard abbreviations
- ISO 4: Exp. Math.

Indexing
- ISSN: 1058-6458 (print); 1944-950X (web)
- LCCN: 2003242218
- OCLC no.: 24346305

Links
- Journal homepage

Experimental Mathematics is a quarterly scientific journal of mathematics published by A K Peters, Ltd. until 2010, now by Taylor & Francis. The journal publishes papers in experimental mathematics, broadly construed. The journal's mission statement describes its scope as follows: "Experimental Mathematics publishes original papers featuring formal results inspired by experimentation, conjectures suggested by experiments, and data supporting significant hypotheses." Its editor-in-chief is Alexander Kasprzyk (University of Nottingham).

== History ==
Experimental Mathematics was established in 1992 by David Epstein, Silvio Levy, and Klaus Peters. Experimental Mathematics was the first mathematical research journal to concentrate on experimental mathematics and to explicitly acknowledge its importance for mathematics as a general research field. The journal's launching was described as "something of a watershed". Indeed, the launching of the journal in 1992 was surrounded by some controversy in the mathematical community about the value and validity of experimentation in mathematical research. Some critics of the new journal suggested that it be renamed as the "Journal of Unproved Theorems". In a 1995 article in the Notices of the American Mathematical Society, in part responding to such criticism, Epstein and Levy described the journal's aims as follows:

But the main difference reflects the philosophy above: we are interested not only in theorems and proofs but also in the way in which they have been or can be reached. Note that we do value proofs: experimentally inspired results that can be proved are more desirable than conjectural ones. However, we do publish significant conjectures or explorations in the hope of inspiring other, perhaps better-equipped researchers to carry on the investigation. The objective of Experimental Mathematics is to play a role in the discovery of formal proofs, not to displace them.

Despite the initial controversy, Experimental Mathematics quickly established a solid reputation and is now a highly respected mathematical publication. The journal is reviewed cover-to-cover in Mathematical Reviews and Zentralblatt MATH and is indexed in the Web of Science.
