= Federico Frattini =

Italian academic

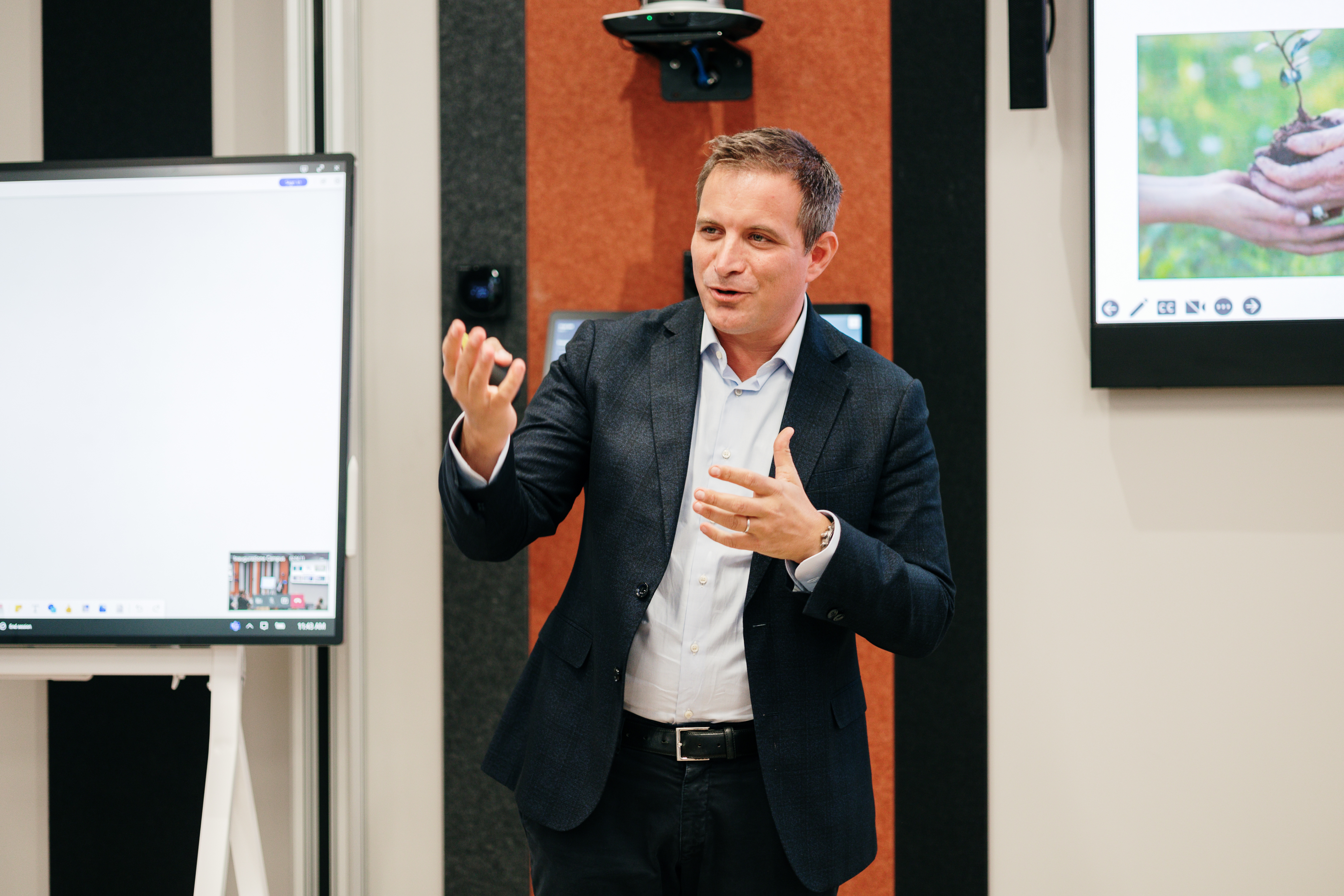
- Born: 1980 (age 45–46); Legnano, Italy

Academic work
- Discipline: Innovation Management, Strategic Management, Technology Management
- Institutions: Polytechnic University of Milan, POLIMI Graduate School of Management

Federico Frattini (born 1980) is an Italian strategy, innovation, and technology management scholar.

He is a full Professor of Strategic Innovation at Polytechnic University of Milan (Italy) and Dean of POLIMI Graduate School of Management.

== Education ==
Federico Frattini holds a BSc and an MSc in Management Engineering from LIUC – Università Carlo Cattaneo (Castellanza, Varese, Italy) and a PhD in Management Engineering from Polytechnic University of Milan. He was also Visiting Student at SPRU – University of Sussex (UK), under the supervision of Prof. Joseph Tidd.

== Research ==
Frattini signed more than 200 international publications in the field of innovation and technology management, among which scholarly articles in journals such as Strategic Management Journal, Academy of Management Perspectives, Journal of Product Innovation Management, Entrepreneurship Theory & Practice, California Management Review, Global Strategy Journal, and many others.

His research has been featured in various practitioners’ journals and magazines such Harvard Business Review, MIT Sloan Management Review, European Business Review, Il Sole 24 Ore.

In 2013, at the age of 33, he was included among the top 50 researchers worldwide in the area of technology and innovation management by the International Association of Management of Technology (IAMOT).

Frattini also served as Honorary Researcher at the University of Lancaster Management School and is currently Associate Editor of the CERN IdeaSquare Journal of Experimental Innovation and Member of the Editorial Board of the European Journal of Innovation Management and of the Journal of Product Innovation Management.

== Service ==
At POLIMI Graduate School of Management (formerly MIP Politecnico di Milano), Frattini worked, from 2012 to 2019, first as Director of the Evening Executive MBA, then as Director of the MBA and Executive MBA Programs and as Associate Dean for Digital transformation.

He worked for the development of digital learning programs in the School, such as the Flex Executive MBA, the International Flex Executive MBA, and the innovative personalized and continuous learning platform FLEXA, developed in partnership with Microsoft.

He is the Dean of the Business School since 2020.

== Impact ==
Since 2007 Prof. Frattini focused on the energy business. During this years he also co-founded – together with Vittorio Chiesa and Davide Chiaroni – Energy & Strategy, a research group involved in research, advisory and education in fields such as renewable energies, energy efficiency, smart mobility, circular economy, digital energy, hydrogen. Today Frattini is Vice-Director of Energy & Strategy.
