= Frattini subgroup =

Intersection of all maximal subgroups

Hasse diagram of the lattice of subgroups of the dihedral group Dih_{4}. In the second row are the maximal subgroups; their intersection (the Frattini subgroup) is the central element in the third row. So Dih_{4} has only one non-generating element beyond e.

In mathematics, particularly in group theory, the Frattini subgroup $\Phi(G)$ of a group G is the intersection of all maximal subgroups of G. For the case that G has no maximal subgroups, for example the trivial group {e} or a Prüfer group, it is defined by $\Phi(G)=G$. It is analogous to the Jacobson radical in the theory of rings, and intuitively can be thought of as the subgroup of "small elements" (see the "non-generator" characterization below). It is named after Giovanni Frattini, who defined the concept in a paper published in 1885.

== Some facts ==
- $\Phi(G)$ is equal to the set of all non-generators or non-generating elements of G. A non-generating element of G is an element that can always be removed from a generating set; that is, an element a of G such that whenever X is a generating set of G containing a, $X \setminus \{a\}$ is also a generating set of G.
- $\Phi(G)$ is always a characteristic subgroup of G; in particular, it is always a normal subgroup of G.
- If G is finite, then $\Phi(G)$ is nilpotent.
- If G is a finite p-group, then $\Phi(G)=G^p [G,G]$. Thus the Frattini subgroup is the smallest (with respect to inclusion) normal subgroup N such that the quotient group $G/N$ is an elementary abelian group, i.e., isomorphic to a direct sum of cyclic groups of order p. Moreover, if the quotient group $G/\Phi(G)$ (also called the Frattini quotient of G) has order $p^k$, then k is the smallest number of generators for G (that is, the smallest cardinality of a generating set for G). In particular, a finite p-group is cyclic if and only if its Frattini quotient is cyclic (of order p). A finite p-group is elementary abelian if and only if its Frattini subgroup is the trivial group, $\Phi(G)=\{e\}$.
- If H and K are finite, then $\Phi(H \times K) = \Phi(H) \times \Phi(K)$.

An example of a group with nontrivial Frattini subgroup is the cyclic group G of order $p^2$, where p is prime, generated by a, say; here, $\Phi(G) = \left\langle a^p\right\rangle$.

== See also ==
- Fitting subgroup
- Frattini's argument
- Socle
