= Uniformly bounded representation =

In mathematics, a uniformly bounded representation $T$ of a locally compact group $G$ on a Hilbert space $H$ is a homomorphism into the bounded invertible operators which is continuous for the strong operator topology, and such that $\sup_{g\in G} \|T_g\|_{B(H)}$ is finite. In 1947 Béla Szőkefalvi-Nagy established that any uniformly bounded representation of the integers or the real numbers is unitarizable, i.e. conjugate by an invertible operator to a unitary representation. For the integers this gives a criterion for an invertible operator to be similar to a unitary operator: the operator norms of all the positive and negative powers must be uniformly bounded. The result on unitarizability of uniformly bounded representations was extended in 1950 by Dixmier, Day and Nakamura-Takeda to all locally compact amenable groups, following essentially the method of proof of Sz-Nagy. The result is known to fail for non-amenable groups such as SL(2,R) and the free group on two generators. Dixmier (1950) conjectured that a locally compact group is amenable if and only if every uniformly bounded representation is unitarizable.

== Statement ==
Let G be a locally compact amenable group and let T_{g} be a homomorphism of G into GL(H), the group of an invertible operators on a Hilbert space such that

- for every x in H the vector-valued gx on G is continuous;
- the operator norms of the operators T_{g} are uniformly bounded.

Then there is a positive invertible operator S on H such that S T_{g} S^{−1} is unitary for every g in G.

As a consequence, if T is an invertible operator with all its positive and negative powers uniformly bounded in operator norm, then T is conjugate by a positive invertible operator to a unitary.

== Proof ==
By assumption the continuous functions

$$\displaystyle{f_{x,y}(g)=(T_g^{-1}x,T_g^{-1}y),}$$

generate a separable unital C* subalgebra A of the uniformly bounded continuous functions on G. By construction the algebra is invariant under left translation. By amenability there is an invariant state φ on A. It follows that

$$\displaystyle{(x,y)_0 =\varphi(f_{x,y})}$$

is a new inner product on H satisfying

$$\displaystyle{M^{-1}\|x\| \le \|x\|_0 \le M\|x\|}$$

where

$$\displaystyle{M=\sup_g \|T_g\| < \infty.}$$

So there is a positive invertible operator P such that

$$\displaystyle{(x,y)_0 =(Px,y).}$$

By construction

$$\displaystyle{(T_gx,T_gy)_0=(x,y)_0.}$$

Let S be the unique positive square root of P. Then

$$\displaystyle{(ST_g x,ST_gy)=(PT_gx,T_gy)=(Px,y) =(Sx,Sy).}$$

Applying S^{−1} to x and y, it follows that

$$\displaystyle{(ST_gS^{-1} x, ST_gS^{-1} y)=(x,y).}$$

Since the operators

$$\displaystyle{U_g=ST_gS^{-1}}$$

are invertible, it follows that they are unitary.

== Examples of non-unitarizable representations ==
=== SL(2,R) ===
The complementary series of irreducible unitary representations of SL(2,R) was introduced by Bargmann (1947). These representations can be realized on functions on the circle or on the real line: the Cayley transform provides the unitary equivalence between the two realizations.

In fact for 0 < σ < 1/2 and f, g continuous functions on the circle define

$$\displaystyle{(f,g)_\sigma={1\over 4\pi^2} \int_{-\pi}^\pi\int_{-\pi}^\pi f(s)\overline{g(t)} k_\sigma(s-t) \,ds\, dt,}$$

where

$$\displaystyle{k_\sigma(s)=(1-\cos s)^{\sigma-1/2}.}$$

Since the function k_{σ} is integrable, this integral converges. In fact

$$\displaystyle{(f,g)_\sigma \le \|f\|\cdot \|g\|,}$$

where the norms are the usual L^{2} norms.

The functions

$$\displaystyle{f_m(t)=e^{imt}}$$

are orthogonal with

$$\displaystyle{(f_m,f_m)_\sigma=\prod_{i=1}^{|m|} {i-1/2-\sigma\over i-1/2+\sigma}= {\Gamma(1/2 +\sigma)\Gamma(|m|+1/2-\sigma)\over \Gamma(1/2-\sigma)\Gamma(m+1/2+\sigma)}.}$$

Since these quantities are positive, (f,g)_{σ} defines an inner product. The Hilbert space completion is denoted by H_{σ}.

For F, G continuous functions of compact support on R, define

$$\displaystyle{(F,G)_\sigma^\prime=\int_{-\infty}^\infty\int_{-\infty}^\infty F(x)\overline{G(y)} |x-y|^{2\sigma-1}\,dx\, dy.}$$

Since, regarded as distributions, the Fourier transform of |x|^{2σ – 1} is C_{σ}|t|^{−2σ} for some positive constant C_{σ}, the above expression can be rewritten:

$$\displaystyle{(F,G)_\sigma^\prime=C_\sigma\int_{-\infty}^\infty \widehat{F}(t)\overline{\widehat{G}(t)} |t|^{-2\sigma}\, dt.}$$

Hence it is an inner product. Let H'_{σ} denote its Hilbert space completion.

The Cayley transform gives rise to an operator U:

$$\displaystyle{Uf(x)=2^{\sigma/2 - 3/4} \pi^{-1} |x+i|^{1-2\sigma} f\left({x-i\over x+i}\right).}$$

U extends to an isometry of H_{σ} onto H '_{σ}. Its adjoint is given by

$$\displaystyle{U^*F(e^{it})=2^{3/4-\sigma/2} \pi |1- e^{it}|^{1-2\sigma} F\left({1+e^{it}\over 1-e^{it}}\right).}$$

The Cayley transform exchanges the actions by Möbius transformations of SU(1,1) on S^{1} and of SL(2, R) on R.

The operator U intertwines corresponding actions of SU(1,1) on H_{σ} and SL(2,R) on H '_{σ}.

For g in SU(1,1) given by

$$\displaystyle{g=\begin{pmatrix} \alpha & \beta \\ \overline{\beta} & \overline{\alpha}\end{pmatrix},}$$

with

$$\displaystyle{|\alpha|^2 - |\beta|^2=1,}$$

and f continuous, set

$$\displaystyle{\pi_\sigma(g^{-1}) f(z)=|\overline{\beta}z+\overline{\alpha}|^{1-2\sigma}f\left({\alpha z +\beta\over\overline{\beta}z +\overline{\alpha}}\right).}$$

For g' in SL(2,R) given by

$$\displaystyle{g^\prime=\begin{pmatrix} a & b \\ c & d \end{pmatrix},}$$

with ad – bc = 1, set

$$\displaystyle{\pi^\prime_\sigma((g^\prime)^{-1}) F(x) =|cx+d|^{1-2\sigma} F\left({ax+b\over cx +d}\right).}$$

If g ' corresponds to g under the Cayley transform then

$$\displaystyle{U\pi_\sigma(g)U^* =\pi^\prime_\sigma(g^\prime).}$$

Polar decomposition shows that SL(2,R) = KAK with K = SO(2) and A the subgroup of positive diagonal matrices. K corresponds to the diagonal matrices in SU(1,1). Since evidently K acts unitarily on H_{σ} and A acts unitarily on H '_{σ}, both representations are unitary. The representations are irreducible because the action of the Lie algebra on the basis vectors f_{m} is irreducible. This family of irreducible unitary representations is called the complementary series.

Ehrenpreis & Mautner (1955) constructed an analytic continuation of this family of representations as follows. If s = σ + iτ, g lies in SU(1,1) and f in H_{σ}, define

$$\displaystyle{\pi_s(g^{-1}) f(z)=|\overline{\beta}z+\overline{\alpha}|^{1-2s}f\left({\alpha z +\beta\over\overline{\beta}z +\overline{\alpha}}\right).}$$

Similarly if g ' lies in SL(2,R) and F in H '_{σ}, define

$$\displaystyle{\pi^\prime_s((g^\prime)^{-1}) F(x) =|cx+d|^{1-2s} F\left({ax+b\over cx +d}\right).}$$

As before the unitary U intertwines these two actions. K acts unitarily on H_{σ} and A by a uniformly bounded representation on H '_{σ}. The action of the standard basis of the complexification Lie algebra on this basis can be computed:

$$\displaystyle{\pi_s(L_0)f_m=mf_m, \,\, \pi_s(L_{-1})f_m=-(m+1/2+s)f_{m+1},\,\, \pi_s(L_1)f_m=-(m-1/2-s)f_{m-1}.}$$

If the representation were unitarizable for τ ≠ 0, then the similarity operator T on H_{σ} would have to commute with K, since K preserves the original inner product. The vectors Tf_{m} would therefore still be orthogonal for the new inner product and the operators

$$\displaystyle{L_i^\prime=TL_iT^{-1}}$$

would satisfy the same relations for

$$\displaystyle{f_m^\prime = Tf_m=\lambda_m f_m.}$$

In this case

$$\displaystyle{[L_m^\prime,L_n^\prime]=(m-n)L_{m+n}^\prime,\,\,(L_i^\prime)^*=L_{-i}^\prime.}$$

It is elementary to verify that infinitesimally such a representation cannot exist if τ ≠ 0.

Indeed, let v_{0} = f '_{0} and set

$$\displaystyle{v_1=L^\prime_{-1}v_0.}$$

Then

$$\displaystyle{L^\prime_1 v_1=c v_{0}}$$

for some constant c. On the other hand,

$$\displaystyle{\|v_{1}\|^2=(L_{-1}^\prime v_0,v_{1})=(v_0,L_1^\prime v_{1})=\overline{c}\|v_0\|^2.}$$

Thus c must be real and positive. The formulas above show that

$$\displaystyle{c={1\over 4}-s^2={1\over 4}-\sigma^2 +\tau^2 -2i\sigma\tau,}$$

so the representation π_{s} is unitarizable only if τ = 0.

=== Free group on two generators ===
The group G = SL(2,R) contains the discrete group Γ = SL(2,Z) as a closed subgroup of finite covolume, since this subgroup acts on the upper half plane with a fundamental domain of finite hyperbolic area. The group SL(2,Z) contains a subgroup of index 12 isomorphic to F_{2} the free group on two generators. Hence G has a subgroup Γ_{1} of finite covolume, isomorphic to F_{2}. If L is a closed subgroup of finite covolume in a locally compact group G, and π is non-unitarizable uniformly bounded representation of G on a Hilbert space L, then its restriction to L is uniformly bounded and non-unitarizable. For if not, applying a bounded invertible operator, the inner product can be made invariant under L; and then in turn invariant under G by redefining

$$\displaystyle{(x,y)_1=\int_{H\backslash G} (gx,gy) \, dg.}$$

As in the previous proof, uniform boundedess guarantees that the norm defined by this inner product is equivalent to the original inner product. But then the original representation would be unitarizable on G, a contradiction. The same argument works for any discrete subgroup of G of finite covolume. In particular the surface groups, which are cocompact subgroups, have uniformly bounded representations that are not unitarizable.

There are more direct constructions of uniformly bounded representations of free groups that are non-unitarizable: these are surveyed in Pisier (2001). The first such examples are described in Figà-Talamanca & Picardello (1983), where an analogue of the complementary series is constructed.

Later Szwarc (1988) gave a related but simpler construction, on the Hilbert space H = $\ell$^{2}(F_{2}), of a holomorphic family of uniformly bounded representations π_{z} of F_{2} for |z| < 1; these are non-unitarizable when 1/√3 < |z| < 1 and z is not real. Let L(g) denote the reduced word length on F_{2} for a given set of generators a, b. Let T be the bounded operator defined on basis elements by

$$\displaystyle{Te_1=0,\,\, Te_g=e_{g^\prime},}$$

where g ' is obtained by erasing the last letter in the expression of g as a reduced word; identifying F_{2} with the vertices of its Cayley graph, a rooted tree, this corresponds to passing from a vertex to the next closest vertex to the origin or root. For |z| < 1

$$\displaystyle{\pi_z(g) = (I-zT)^{-1}\lambda(g)(I-zT)}$$

is well-defined on finitely supported functions. Pytlik & Szwarc (1986) had earlier proved that it extends to a uniformly bounded representation on H satisfying

$$\displaystyle{\|\pi_z(g)\|\le {1+|z|\over 1-|z|}.}$$

In fact it is easy to check that the operator λ(g)Tλ(g)^{−1} – T has finite rank, with rangeV_{g}, the finite-dimensional space of functions supported on the set of vertices joining g to the origin. For on any function vanishing on this finite set, T and λ(g)Tλ(g)^{−1} are equal; and they both leave invariant V_{g}, on which they acts as contractions and adjoints of each other. Hence if f has finite support and norm 1,

$$\displaystyle{\|\pi_z(g)f\|=\|\lambda(g)f+\sum_{n=0}^\infty z^{n+1} T^n[T,\lambda(g)]f\|\le 1 + 2 \sum_{n=0}^n |z|^{n+1} ={1+|z|\over 1-|z|}.}$$

For |z| < 1/√3, these representations are all similar to the regular representation λ. If on the other hand 1/√3 < |z| <1, then the operator

$$\displaystyle{D=\pi_z(a)+\pi_z(a^{-1}) + \pi_z(b) +\pi_z(b^{-1})}$$

satisfies

$$\displaystyle{Df=(3z +z^{-1})f}$$

where f in H is defined by

$$\displaystyle{f(1)=1,\,\, f(g)={3\over 4} (3z)^{-L(g)} \,\,(g\ne 1).}$$

Thus, if z is not real, D has an eigenvalue which is not real. But then π_{z} cannot be unitarizable, since otherwise D would be similar to a self-adjoint operator.

== Dixmier problem ==
Jacques Dixmier asked in 1950 whether amenable groups are characterized by unitarizability, i.e. the property that all their uniformly bounded representations are unitarizable. This problem remains open to this day.

An elementary induction argument shows that a subgroup of a unitarizable group remains unitarizable. Therefore, the von Neumann conjecture would have implied a positive answer to Dixmier's problem, had it been true. In any case, it follows that a counter-example to Dixmier's conjecture could only be a non-amenable group without free subgroups. In particular, Dixmier's conjecture is true for all linear groups by the Tits alternative.

A criterion due to Epstein and Monod shows that there are also non-unitarizable groups without free subgroups. In fact, even some Burnside groups are non-unitarizable, as shown by Monod and Ozawa.

Considerable progress has been made by Pisier who linked unitarizability to a notion of factorization length. This allowed him to solve a modified form of the Dixmier problem.

The potential gap between unitarizability and amenability can be further illustrated by the following open problems, all of which become elementary if "unitarizable" were replaced by "amenable":

- Is the direct product of two unitarizable groups unitarizable?
- Is a directed union of unitarizable groups unitarizable?
- If $G$ contains a normal amenable subgroup $N$ such $G/N$ is unitarizable, does it follow that $G$ is unitarizable? (It is elementary that $G$ is unitarizable if $N$ is so and $G/N$ is amenable.)
