= Linear group =

Type of mathematical group

In mathematics, a matrix group is a group G consisting of invertible matrices over a specified field K, with the operation of matrix multiplication. A linear group is a group that is isomorphic to a matrix group (that is, admitting a faithful, finite-dimensional representation over K).

Any finite group is linear, because it can be realized by permutation matrices using Cayley's theorem. Among infinite groups, linear groups form an interesting and tractable class. Examples of groups that are not linear include groups which are "too big" (for example, the group of permutations of an infinite set), or which exhibit some pathological behavior (for example, finitely generated infinite torsion groups).

== Definition and basic examples ==
A group G is said to be linear if there exists a field K, an integer d and an injective homomorphism from G to the general linear group GL_{d}(K) (a faithful linear representation of dimension d over K): if needed one can mention the field and dimension by saying that G is linear of degree d over K. Basic instances are groups which are defined as subgroups of a linear group, for example:

1. The group GL_{n}(K) itself;
2. The special linear group SL_{n}(K) (the subgroup of matrices with determinant 1);
3. The group of invertible upper (or lower) triangular matrices;
4. If g_{i} is a collection of elements in GL_{n}(K) indexed by a set I, then the subgroup generated by the g_{i} is a linear group.

In the study of Lie groups, it is sometimes pedagogically convenient to restrict attention to Lie groups that can be faithfully represented over the field of complex numbers. (Some authors require that the group be represented as a closed subgroup of the GL_{n}(C).) Books that follow this approach include Hall (2015) and Rossmann (2002).

== Classes of linear groups ==
=== Classical groups and related examples ===
The so-called classical groups generalize the examples 1 and 2 above. They arise as linear algebraic groups, that is, as subgroups of GL_{n} defined by a finite number of equations. Basic examples are orthogonal, unitary and symplectic groups but it is possible to construct more using division algebras (for example the unit group of a quaternion algebra is a classical group). Note that the projective groups associated to these groups are also linear, though less obviously. For example, the group PSL_{2}(R) is not a group of 2 × 2 matrices, but it has a faithful representation as 3 × 3 matrices (the adjoint representation), which can be used in the general case.

Many Lie groups are linear, but not all of them. The universal cover of SL_{2}(R) is not linear, as are many solvable groups, for instance the quotient of the Heisenberg group by a central cyclic subgroup.

Discrete subgroups of classical Lie groups (for example lattices or thin groups) are also examples of interesting linear groups.

=== Finite groups ===
A finite group G of order n is linear of degree at most n over any field K. This statement is sometimes called Cayley's theorem, and simply results from the fact that the action of G on the group ring K[G] by left (or right) multiplication is linear and faithful. The finite groups of Lie type (classical groups over finite fields) are an important family of finite simple groups, as they take up most of the slots in the classification of finite simple groups.

=== Finitely generated matrix groups ===
While example 4 above is too general to define a distinctive class (it includes all linear groups), restricting to a finite index set I, that is, to finitely generated groups allows to construct many interesting examples. For example:

- The ping-pong lemma can be used to construct many examples of linear groups which are free groups (for instance the group generated by $\bigl( {}_2^1 \,_1^0\bigr), \, \bigl( {}_0^1 \,_1^2\bigr)$ is free).
- Arithmetic groups are known to be finitely generated. On the other hand, it is a difficult problem to find an explicit set of generators for a given arithmetic group.
- Braid groups (which are defined as a finitely presented group) have faithful linear representation on a finite-dimensional complex vector space where the generators act by explicit matrices. The mapping class group of a genus 2 surface is also known to be linear.

=== Examples from geometry ===
In some cases the fundamental group of a manifold can be shown to be linear by using representations coming from a geometric structure. For example, all closed surfaces of genus at least 2 are hyperbolic Riemann surfaces. Via the uniformization theorem this gives rise to a representation of its fundamental group in the isometry group of the hyperbolic plane, which is isomorphic to PSL_{2}(R) and this realizes the fundamental group as a Fuchsian group. A generalization of this construction is given by the notion of a (G,X)-structure on a manifold.

Another example is the fundamental group of Seifert manifolds. On the other hand, it is not known whether all fundamental groups of 3–manifolds are linear.

== Properties ==
While linear groups are a vast class of examples, among all infinite groups they are distinguished by many remarkable properties. Finitely generated linear groups have the following properties:

- They are residually finite;
- Burnside's theorem: a torsion group of finite exponent which is linear over a field of characteristic 0 must be finite;
- Schur's theorem: a torsion linear group is locally finite. In particular, if it is finitely generated then it is finite.
- Selberg's lemma: any finitely generated linear group contains a torsion-free subgroup of finite index.

The Tits alternative states that a linear group either contains a non-abelian free group or else is virtually solvable (that is, contains a solvable group of finite index). This has many further consequences, for example:

- the Dehn function of a finitely generated linear group can only be either polynomial or exponential;
- an amenable linear group is virtually solvable, in particular elementary amenable;
- the von Neumann conjecture is true for linear groups.

== Examples of non-linear groups ==
It is not hard to give infinitely generated examples of non-linear groups: for example the infinite abelian group (Z/2Z)^{N} x (Z/3Z)^{N} cannot be linear. Since the symmetric group on an infinite set contains this group it is also not linear. Finding finitely generated examples is subtler and usually requires the use of one of the properties listed above.

- Since any finitely generated linear group is residually finite, it cannot be both simple and infinite. Thus finitely generated infinite simple groups, for example Thompson's group F, and the quotient of Higman's group by a maximal proper normal subgroup, are not linear.
- By the corollary to the Tits alternative mentioned above, groups of intermediate growth such as Grigorchuk's group are not linear.
- Again by the Tits alternative, as mentioned above all counterexamples to the von Neumann conjecture are not linear. This includes Thompson's group F and Tarski monster groups.
- By Burnside's theorem, infinite, finitely generated torsion groups such as Tarski monster groups cannot be linear.
- There are examples of hyperbolic groups which are not linear, obtained as quotients of lattices in the Lie groups Sp(n, 1).
- The outer automorphism group Out(F_{n}) of the free group is known not to be linear for n at least 4.
- In contrast with the case of braid groups, it is an open question whether the mapping class group of a surface of genus > 2 is linear.

== Representation theory ==
Once a group has been established to be linear it is interesting to try to find "optimal" faithful linear representations for it, for example of the lowest possible dimension, or even to try to classify all its linear representations (including those which are not faithful). These questions are the object of representation theory. Salient parts of the theory include:

- Representation theory of finite groups;
- Representation theory of Lie groups and more generally linear algebraic groups.

The representation theory of infinite finitely generated groups is in general mysterious; the object of interest in this case are the character varieties of the group, which are well understood only in very few cases, for example free groups, surface groups and more generally lattices in Lie groups (for example through Margulis' superrigidity theorem and other rigidity results).
