= Von Neumann conjecture =

Disproven mathematical theory concerning Banach-Tarski and amenable groups

In mathematics, the von Neumann conjecture stated that a group G is non-amenable if and only if G contains a subgroup that is a free group on two generators. The conjecture was disproved in 1980.

In 1929, during his work on the Banach–Tarski paradox, John von Neumann defined the concept of amenable groups and showed that no amenable group contains a free subgroup of rank 2. The suggestion that the converse might hold, that is, that every non-amenable group contains a free subgroup on two generators, was made by a number of different authors in the 1950s and 1960s. Although von Neumann's name is popularly attached to the conjecture, its first written appearance seems to be due to Mahlon Marsh Day in 1957.

The Tits alternative is a fundamental theorem which, in particular, establishes the conjecture within the class of linear groups.

The historically first potential counterexample is Thompson group F. While its amenability is a wide-open problem, the general conjecture was shown to be false in 1980 by Alexander Ol'shanskii; he demonstrated that Tarski monster groups, constructed by him, which are easily seen not to have free subgroups of rank 2, are not amenable. Two years later, Sergei Adian showed that certain Burnside groups are also counterexamples. None of these counterexamples are finitely presented, and for some years it was considered possible that the conjecture held for finitely presented groups. However, in 2003, Alexander Ol'shanskii and Mark Sapir exhibited a collection of finitely presented groups which do not satisfy the conjecture.

In 2013, Nicolas Monod found an easy counterexample to the conjecture. Given by piecewise projective homeomorphisms of the line, the group is remarkably simple to understand. Even though it is not amenable, it shares many known properties of amenable groups in a straightforward way. In 2013, Yash Lodha and Justin Tatch Moore isolated a finitely presented non-amenable subgroup of Monod's group. This provides the first torsion-free finitely presented counterexample, and admits a presentation with 3 generators and 9 relations. Lodha later showed that this group satisfies the property $F_{\infty}$, which is a stronger finiteness property.
