= Infinite group =

In group theory, an area of mathematics, an infinite group is a group whose underlying set contains infinitely many elements. In other words, it is a group of infinite order. The structure of infinite groups is often a question of mathematical analysis of the asymptotics of how various invariants grow relative to a generating set, or how a group acts on a topological or measure space. In contrast, the structure of finite groups is determined largely by methods of abstract algebra.

== Examples ==
- (Z, +), the group of integers with addition is infinite, as is (Q, +) the group of rational numbers with addition
- Non-discrete Lie groups are infinite. For example, (R, +), the group of real numbers with addition is an infinite group
- The general linear group of order n > 0 over an infinite field is infinite
- The Infinite dihedral group
- The Tarski monster group
- The Prüfer p-group
- A free group
- SL(2,Z)
- Amenable groups
- Thompson groups
- Grigorchuk group
- Lamplighter groups

== Torsion ==
An infinite group is called a torsion group if every element has finite order. Examples include the Prüfer p-group and certain Burnside groups. In contrast, a group is torsion-free if no non-identity element has finite order, such as $\mathbb{Z}$ or free groups.

== Structure and classification ==
Many infinite groups are given in terms of a set of generators and relations. For example, a free group is a group on a set of generators with no relations, whereas a braid group is a group on generators $g_i$, where $i$ is an integer in $[0,n]$, with relations $g_i g_{i+1} g_i = g_{i+1} g_i g_{i+1}$ and $g_ig_j=g_jg_i$ if $|i-j|>1$.

Infinite groups can be finitely generated, such as $\mathbb Z$ or $\operatorname{SL}(n,\mathbb Z)$, or infinitely generated such as $(\mathbb Q,+)$ or any Lie group; finitely presented such as any free group (on a finite set of generators) or braid groups. Groups may also be infinitely presented, etc.

An infinite group may be residually finite, meaning that every element is non-trivial in some finite quotient. Many groups, like $\operatorname{SL}(n,\mathbb Z)$, are residually finite; whereas others like the Tarski monster groups, are not.

Many infinite groups are linear groups, meaning that they have a faithful representation on a finite-dimensional vector space. This includes groups like $\operatorname{SL}(n,\mathbb Z)$ and every classical group (via its adjoint representation), and every finitely-generated torsion-free nilpotent group, by Malcev's theorem, but not groups like the metaplectic group.

Some infinite groups are simple, such as the Thompson groups.

== Asymptotics ==
An infinite group equipped with a generating set $\{\gamma_i \mid i \in I\}$ inherits a natural metric structure via the word metric. This is the unique left-invariant distance function such that $d(\gamma_i, e) = d(\gamma_i^{-1}, e) = 1$ for each generator $\gamma_i$, and distances extend by minimal word length. The resulting metric space is locally a discrete topological space, but its large-scale geometry exhibits meaningful structure. For instance, the volume of a ball of radius $r$ (i.e., the number of group elements expressible using at most $r$ generators) grows in a way that reflects intrinsic properties of the group—such as polynomial growth in nilpotent groups or exponential growth in free groups.

A finitely generated group has polynomial growth if and only if it is virtually nilpotent, and that the group's large-scale geometry can often be understood via its asymptotic cone—a kind of limiting metric space that captures the group's behavior "at infinity".

Many other aspects of infinite groups can be expressed in terms of the word metric, such as amenability: a group is not amenable, if and only if there exist constants $d$ and $C$ such that, for every finite subset $S$, $|S|\le C |\partial_d S|$, where $\partial_d S$ is the set of points within a distance $d$ of any element of $S$.

== See also ==
- Borel equivalence relation
- Descriptive set theory
- Finitely generated group
- Infinite-dimensional Lie group
- Locally compact group
- Polish group
