= Thin group =

In mathematics, a thin group has several unrelated definitions:

- Thin group (finite group theory) a finite group such that for any odd prime the Sylow p-subgroups of the 2-local subgroups are cyclic.
- Thin group (algebraic group theory) a discrete subgroup of infinite covolume.
- Thin group (combinatorial group theory) a group whose Cayley graph has small girth.
- In the theory of finite p-groups, a thin group is a finite p-group such that any set of pairwise incomparable normal subgroups has at most p+1 elements.
- In infinite group theory, a thin group is a group with no infinite Sylow subgroup.
