= Virtual property =

Virtual property may refer to:

- A group-theoretic property that holds virtually
- The analogue of property in a virtual economy

== See also ==
- Virtual goods
