= Left-invariant =

Left-invariant or left translation-invariant generally refers to the invariance of some mathematical object under the operation of left translation. Right-invariant is defined similarly. Common examples include:

- A left-invariant measure on a topological group, as one of the defining properties of a (left) Haar measure
- A left-invariant mean on a topological group, used to define amenability
- A left-invariant metric on a topological group
- A left-invariant vector field on a Lie group (one way to view an element of its Lie algebra)
- A left-invariant differential operator on a Lie group, a generalisation of the former
- A left-invariant Riemannian metric on a Lie group

== See also ==
- Translation invariance
