= Ping-pong lemma =

Aspect of group theory in mathematics

In mathematics, the ping-pong lemma, or table-tennis lemma, is any of several mathematical statements that ensure that several elements in a group acting on a set freely generates a free subgroup of that group.

== History ==
The ping-pong argument goes back to the late 19th century and is commonly attributed to Felix Klein who used it to study subgroups of Kleinian groups, that is, of discrete groups of isometries of the hyperbolic 3-space or, equivalently Möbius transformations of the Riemann sphere. The ping-pong lemma was a key tool used by Jacques Tits in his 1972 paper containing the proof of a famous result now known as the Tits alternative. The result states that a finitely generated linear group is either virtually solvable or contains a free subgroup of rank two. The ping-pong lemma and its variations are widely used in geometric topology and geometric group theory.

Modern versions of the ping-pong lemma can be found in many books such as Lyndon & Schupp, de la Harpe, Bridson & Haefliger and others.

== Formal statements ==
=== Ping-pong lemma for several subgroups ===
This version of the ping-pong lemma ensures that several subgroups of a group acting on a set generate a free product. The following statement appears in Olijnyk and Suchchansky (2004), and the proof is from de la Harpe (2000).

Let G be a group acting on a set X and let H_{1}, H_{2}, ..., H_{k} be subgroups of G where k ≥ 2, such that at least one of these subgroups has order greater than 2. Suppose there exist pairwise disjoint nonempty subsets X_{1}, X_{2}, ...,X_{k} of X such that the following holds:

- For any i ≠ s and for any h in H_{i}, h ≠ 1 we have h(X_{s}) ⊆ X_{i}.

Then
$$\langle H_1,\dots, H_k\rangle=H_1\ast\dots \ast H_k.$$

==== Proof ====
By the definition of free product, it suffices to check that a given (nonempty) reduced word represents a nontrivial element of $G$. Let $w$ be such a word of length $m\geq 2$, and let
$$w = \prod_{i=1}^m w_i,$$
where $w_i \in H_{\alpha_i}$ for some $\alpha_i \in \{1,\dots,k\}$. Since $w$ is reduced, we have $\alpha_i \neq \alpha_{i+1}$ for any $i = 1, \dots, m-1$ and each $w_i$ is distinct from the identity element of $H_{\alpha_i}$. We then let $w$ act on an element of one of the sets $X_i$. As we assume that at least one subgroup $H_i$ has order at least 3, without loss of generality we may assume that $H_1$ has order at least 3. We first make the assumption that $\alpha_1$and $\alpha_m$ are both 1 (which implies $m \geq 3$). From here we consider $w$ acting on $X_2$. We get the following chain of containments:
$$w(X_2) \subseteq \prod_{i=1}^{m-1} w_i(X_1) \subseteq \prod_{i=1}^{m-2} w_i(X_{\alpha_{m-1}}) \subseteq \dots \subseteq w_1(X_{\alpha_2}) \subseteq X_1.$$

By the assumption that different $X_i$'s are disjoint, we conclude that $w$ acts nontrivially on some element of $X_2$, thus $w$ represents a nontrivial element of $G$.

To finish the proof we must consider the three cases:

- if $\alpha_1 = 1,\,\alpha_m \neq 1$, then let $h\in H_1\setminus \{w_1^{-1},1\}$ (such an $h$ exists since by assumption $H_1$ has order at least 3);
- if $\alpha_1 \neq 1,\,\alpha_m=1$, then let $h\in H_1\setminus \{w_m,1\}$;
- and if $\alpha_1\neq 1,\,\alpha_m\neq 1$, then let $h\in H_1\setminus \{1\}$.

In each case, $hwh^{-1}$ after reduction becomes a reduced word with its first and last letter in $H_1$. Finally, $hwh^{-1}$ represents a nontrivial element of $G$, and so does $w$. This proves the claim.

=== The Ping-pong lemma for infinite cyclic subgroups ===
Let G be a group acting on a set X. Let a_{1}, ...,a_{k} be elements of G of infinite order, where k ≥ 2. Suppose there exist disjoint nonempty subsets

X_{1}^{+}, ..., X_{k}^{+} and X_{1}^{–}, ..., X_{k}^{–}

of X with the following properties:

- a_{i}(X − X_{i}^{–}) ⊆ X_{i}^{+} for i = 1, ..., k;
- a_{i}^{−1}(X − X_{i}^{+}) ⊆ X_{i}^{–} for i = 1, ..., k.

Then the subgroup H = ⟨a_{1}, ..., a_{k}⟩ ≤ G generated by a_{1}, ..., a_{k} is free with free basis {a_{1}, ..., a_{k}}.

==== Proof ====
This statement follows as a corollary of the version for general subgroups if we let X_{i} = X_{i}^{+} ∪ X_{i}^{−} and let H_{i} = ⟨a_{i}⟩.

== Examples ==
=== Special linear group example ===
One can use the ping-pong lemma to prove that the subgroup H = ⟨A,B⟩ ≤ SL_{2}(Z), generated by the matrices
$$A = \begin{pmatrix}1 & 2\\ 0 &1 \end{pmatrix}$$
and
$$B = \begin{pmatrix}1 & 0\\ 2 &1 \end{pmatrix}$$
is free of rank two.

==== Proof ====
Indeed, let H_{1} = ⟨A⟩ and H_{2} = ⟨B⟩ be cyclic subgroups of SL_{2}(Z) generated by A and B accordingly. It is not hard to check that A and B are elements of infinite order in SL_{2}(Z) and that
$$H_1 = \{A^n \mid n\in \Z\} = \left\{\begin{pmatrix}1 & 2n\\ 0 & 1 \end{pmatrix} : n\in\Z\right\}$$
and
$$H_2 = \{B^n \mid n\in \Z\} = \left\{\begin{pmatrix}1 & 0\\ 2n & 1 \end{pmatrix} : n\in\Z\right\}.$$

Consider the standard action of SL_{2}(Z) on R^{2} by linear transformations. Put
$$X_1 = \left\{ \begin{pmatrix}x \\ y \end{pmatrix}\in \R^2 : |x|>|y|\right\}$$
and
$$X_2 = \left\{ \begin{pmatrix}x \\ y \end{pmatrix}\in \mathbb R^2 : |x|<|y|\right\}.$$

It is not hard to check, using the above explicit descriptions of H_{1} and H_{2}, that for every nontrivial g ∈ H_{1} we have g(X_{2}) ⊆ X_{1} and that for every nontrivial g ∈ H_{2} we have g(X_{1}) ⊆ X_{2}. Using the alternative form of the ping-pong lemma, for two subgroups, given above, we conclude that H = H_{1} ∗ H_{2}. Since the groups H_{1} and H_{2} are infinite cyclic, it follows that H is a free group of rank two.

=== Word-hyperbolic group example ===
Let G be a word-hyperbolic group which is torsion-free, that is, with no nonidentity elements of finite order. Let g, h ∈ G be two non-commuting elements, that is such that gh ≠ hg. Then there exists M ≥ 1 such that for any integers n ≥ M, m ≥ M the subgroup H = ⟨g^{n}, h^{m}⟩ ≤ G is free of rank two.

==== Sketch of the proof ====
The group G acts on its hyperbolic boundary ∂G by homeomorphisms. It is known that if a in G is a nonidentity element then a has exactly two distinct fixed points, a^{∞} and a^{−∞} in ∂G and that a^{∞} is an attracting fixed point while a^{−∞} is a repelling fixed point.

Since g and h do not commute, basic facts about word-hyperbolic groups imply that g^{∞}, g^{−∞}, h^{∞} and h^{−∞} are four distinct points in ∂G. Take disjoint neighborhoods U_{+}, U_{–}, V_{+}, and V_{–} of g^{∞}, g^{−∞}, h^{∞} and h^{−∞} in ∂G respectively. Then the attracting/repelling properties of the fixed points of g and h imply that there exists M ≥ 1 such that for any integers n ≥ M, m ≥ M we have:

- g^{n}(∂G – U_{–}) ⊆ U_{+}
- g^{−n}(∂G – U_{+}) ⊆ U_{–}
- h^{m}(∂G – V_{–}) ⊆ V_{+}
- h^{−m}(∂G – V_{+}) ⊆ V_{–}

The ping-pong lemma now implies that H = ⟨g^{n}, h^{m}⟩ ≤ G is free of rank two.

== Applications of the ping-pong lemma ==
- The ping-pong lemma is used in Kleinian groups to study their so-called Schottky subgroups. In the Kleinian groups context the ping-pong lemma can be used to show that a particular group of isometries of the hyperbolic 3-space is not just free but also properly discontinuous and geometrically finite.
- Similar Schottky-type arguments are widely used in geometric group theory, particularly for subgroups of word-hyperbolic groups and for automorphism groups of trees.
- The ping-pong lemma is also used for studying Schottky-type subgroups of mapping class groups of Riemann surfaces, where the set on which the mapping class group acts is the Thurston boundary of the Teichmüller space. A similar argument is also utilized in the study of subgroups of the outer automorphism group of a free group.
- One of the most famous applications of the ping-pong lemma is in the proof of Jacques Tits of the so-called Tits alternative for linear groups. (see also for an overview of Tits' proof and an explanation of the ideas involved, including the use of the ping-pong lemma).
- There are generalizations of the ping-pong lemma that produce not just free products but also amalgamated free products and HNN extensions. These generalizations are used, in particular, in the proof of Maskit's Combination Theorem for Kleinian groups.
- There are also versions of the ping-pong lemma which guarantee that several elements in a group generate a free semigroup. Such versions are available both in the general context of a group action on a set, and for specific types of actions, e.g. in the context of linear groups, groups acting on trees and others.

== See also ==
- Free group
- Free product
- Kleinian group
- Tits alternative
- Word-hyperbolic group
- Schottky group
