= Robert Megginson =

American mathematician

- Born: 1948 (age 77–78); Washington, Illinois
- Education: University of Illinois Urbana-Champaign (BS, 1969; AM, 1983; PhD, 1984)
- Awards: Presidential Award for Excellence in Science, Mathematics, and Engineering Mentoring; Ely S. Parker; Yueh-Gin Gung and Dr. Charles Y. Hu Award for Distinguished Service; Inaugural fellow of the American Mathematical Society
- Scientific career
- Fields: mathematics
- Thesis: The Semi-Kadec-Klee Condition and Nearest-Point Properties of Sets in Normed Linear Spaces (1984)
- Doctoral advisor: Mahlon Marsh Day
- Website: websites.umich.edu/~meggin/index.html

Robert Eugene Megginson is an American mathematician, the Arthur F. Thurnau Professor of Mathematics at the University of Michigan. His research concerns functional analysis and Banach spaces; he is the author of the textbook An Introduction to Banach Space Theory (GTM 183, Springer, 1998).

Megginson was born in 1948 in Washington, Illinois, of Oglala Sioux heritage on his mother's side, and grew up in Sheldon, Illinois, where his father was mayor. He earned a degree in physics from the University of Illinois at Urbana–Champaign in 1969, and became a software specialist for the Roper Corporation until 1977, when he returned to graduate school. He earned a master's degree in statistics in 1983, He completed his Ph.D. in 1984 at the University of Illinois, with a thesis on normed vector spaces supervised by Mahlon Marsh Day. This accomplishment made him one of only approximately 12 Native Americans to hold a doctorate in mathematics, and he has taken great interest in underrepresented minorities in mathematics.

Because his wife was employed nearby in Decatur, Illinois, Megginson took a teaching position in 1983, joining the faculty of Eastern Illinois University as an assistant professor, rather than doing postdoctoral research. He moved to the University of Michigan in 1992, was on leave as the deputy director of the Mathematical Sciences Research Institute in Berkeley, California from 2002 to 2004, and became the Thurnau Professor at Michigan in 2008.

Megginson won the U.S. Presidential Award for Excellence in Science, Mathematics, and Engineering Mentoring in 1997. The American Indian Science and Engineering Society gave him their Ely S. Parker Award for lifetime service to the Native American community in 1999. The American Association for the Advancement of Science elected him as a fellow in 2009, and in the same year the Mathematical Association of America gave him their Yueh-Gin Gung and Dr. Charles Y. Hu Award for Distinguished Service, for his work on underrepresented minorities. In 2012, Megginson became one of the inaugural fellows of the American Mathematical Society.
