= Infra-exponential =

A growth rate is said to be infra-exponential or subexponential if it is dominated by all exponential growth rates, however great the doubling time. A continuous function with infra-exponential growth rate will have a Fourier transform that is a Fourier hyperfunction.

Examples of subexponential growth rates arise in the analysis of algorithms, where they give rise to sub-exponential time complexity, and in the growth rate of groups, where a subexponential growth rate implies that a group is amenable.

A positive-valued, unbounded probability distribution $\cal D$ may be called subexponential if its tails are heavy enough so that

$$\lim_{x\to+\infty} \frac{{\Bbb P}(X_1+X_2>x)}{{\Bbb P}(X>x)}=2,\qquad X_1, X_2, X\sim {\cal D},\qquad X_1, X_2 \hbox{ independent.}$$

See Heavy-tailed distribution § Subexponential distributions. Contrariwise, a random variable may also be called subexponential if its tails are sufficiently light to fall off at an exponential or faster rate.
