= Mark Sapir =

American mathematician (1957–2022)

Mark V. Sapir
- Born: February 12, 1957
- Died: October 8, 2022 (aged 65)
- Education: Ural State University
- Known for: research in geometric group theory
- Scientific career
- Fields: Mathematics
- Workplaces: Vanderbilt University
- Doctoral advisor: Lev Shevrin

Mark Sapir (February 12, 1957 - October 8, 2022) was a U.S. and Russian mathematician working in geometric group theory, semigroup theory and combinatorial algebra. He was a Centennial Professor of Mathematics in the Department of Mathematics at Vanderbilt University.

== Education and career ==
Sapir received his undergraduate degree in mathematics (diploma of higher education) from the Ural State University in Yekaterinburg (then called Sverdlovsk), Russia, in 1978. He received his PhD in mathematics (Candidate of Sciences) degree, joint from the Ural State University and Moscow State Pedagogical Institute in 1983, with Lev Shevrin as the advisor.

Afterwards Sapir held faculty appointments at the Ural State University, Sverdlovsk Pedagogical Institute, University of Nebraska–Lincoln, before coming as a professor of mathematics to Vanderbilt University in 1997. He was appointed a Centennial Professor of Mathematics at Vanderbilt in 2001.

Sapir gave an invited talk at the International Congress of Mathematicians in Madrid in 2006. He gave an AMS Invited Address at the American Mathematical Society Sectional Meeting in Huntsville, Alabama in October 2008. He gave a plenary talk at the December 2008 Winter Meeting of the Canadian Mathematical Society. Sapir gave the 33d William J. Spencer Lecture at the Kansas State University in November 2008. He gave the 75th KAM Mathematical Colloquium lecture at the Charles University in Prague in June 2010.

Sapir became a member of the inaugural class of Fellows of the American Mathematical Society in 2012.

Sapir founded the Journal of Combinatorial Algebra, published by the European Mathematical Society, and served as its founding editor-in-chief starting in 2016. He also was an editorial board member for the journals Groups, Complexity, Cryptology and Algebra and Discrete Mathematics. His past editorial board positions include Journal of Pure and Applied Algebra, Groups, Geometry, and Dynamics, Algebra Universalis, and International Journal of Algebra and Computation (as Managing Editor).

A special mathematical conference in honor of Sapir's 60th birthday took place at the University of Illinois at Urbana–Champaign in May 2017.

== Personal life ==
Mark Sapir's elder daughter, Jenya Sapir, is also a mathematician; she was Maryam Mirzakhani's first (out of two) students. Currently, she is an assistant professor in the Department of Mathematics of Binghamton University.

Mark Sapir and his wife Olga Sapir became naturalized U.S. citizens in July 2003, after suing the BCIS in federal court over a multi-year delay of their citizenship application originally filed in 1999.

== Mathematical contributions ==
Sapir's early mathematical work concerned mostly semigroup theory.

In geometric group theory his most well-known and significant results were obtained in two papers published in the Annals of Mathematics in 2002, the first joint with Jean-Camille Birget and Eliyahu Rips, and the second joint with Birget, Rips and Aleksandr Olshansky. The first paper provided an essentially complete description of all the possible growth types of Dehn functions of finitely presented groups. The second paper proved that a finitely presented group has the word problem solvable in non-deterministic polynomial time (NP) if and only if this group embeds as a subgroup of a finitely presented group with polynomial Dehn function. A combined featured review of these two papers in Mathematical Reviews characterized them as ``remarkable foundational results regarding isoperimetric functions of finitely presented groups and their connections with the complexity of the word problem".

Sapir was also known for his work, mostly joint with Cornelia Druţu, on developing the asymptotic cone approach to the study of relatively hyperbolic groups.

A 2002 paper of Sapir and Olshansky constructed the first known finitely presented counter-examples to the Von Neumann conjecture.

Sapir also introduced, in a 1993 paper with Meakin, the notion of a diagram group, based on finite semigroup presentations. He further developed this notion in subsequent joint papers with Guba. Diagram groups provided a new approach to the study of Thompson groups, which appear as important examples of diagram groups.

== Selected publications ==
- Guba, Victor; Sapir, Mark (1997). "Diagram groups". Memoirs of the American Mathematical Society. 130 (620). doi:10.1090/memo/0620. MR 1396957.
- Sapir, Mark V.; Birget, Jean-Camille; Rips, Eliyahu (2002). "Isoperimetric and isodiametric functions of groups". Annals of Mathematics. Second Series. 156 (2): 345–466. arXiv:math/9811106. doi:10.2307/3597196. JSTOR 3597196. MR 1933723. S2CID 14155715.
- Birget, Jean-Camille; Ol'shanskii, Alexander Yu.; Rips, Eliyahu; Sapir, Mark V. (2002). "Isoperimetric functions of groups and computational complexity of the word problem". Annals of Mathematics. Second Series. 156 (2): 467–518. arXiv:math/9811105. doi:10.2307/3597195. JSTOR 3597195. MR 1933724. S2CID 119728458.
- Olʹshanskii, Alexander Yu.; Sapir, Mark V. (2002). "Non-amenable finitely presented torsion-by-cyclic groups". Publications Mathématiques de l'IHÉS. 96 (2003): 43–169. arXiv:math/0208237. doi:10.1007/s10240-002-0006-7. MR 1985031. S2CID 122990460.
- Borisov, Alexander; Sapir, Mark (2005). "Polynomial maps over finite fields and residual finiteness of mapping tori of group endomorphisms". Inventiones Mathematicae. 160 (2): 341–356. arXiv:math/0309121. doi:10.1007/s00222-004-0411-2. MR 2138070. S2CID 6210319.
- Druţu, Cornelia; Sapir, Mark (2008). "Groups acting on tree-graded spaces and splittings of relatively hyperbolic groups". Advances in Mathematics. 217 (3): 1313–1367. arXiv:math/0601305. doi:10.1016/j.aim.2007.08.012. MR 2383901. S2CID 10461978.

== See also ==
- List of International Congresses of Mathematicians Plenary and Invited Speakers
