= Justin T. Moore =

US mathematician

Justin Tatch Moore (born 1974) is a set theorist and logician. He is a full professor in mathematics at Cornell University.

== Career ==
Moore received his PhD in 2000 from the University of Toronto under the supervision of Stevo Todorcevic. He was an assistant professor in mathematics at Boise State University. In the fall of 2007, he joined the faculty at Cornell University.

== Research ==
His primary research area is Ramsey theory of infinite sets. He is known for solutions to the basis problem for uncountable linear orders and to the L space problem from general topology and for his work in determining the consequences of relating the continuum to certain values of the aleph function. Moore, together with his PhD student Yash Lodha, produced the first torsion-free and finitely presented counterexample to the von Neumann-Day problem, originally described by mathematician John von Neumann in 1929. Lodha presented this solution at the London Mathematical Society's Geometric and Cohomological Group Theory symposium in August 2013.

== Awards, distinctions, and recognitions ==
Moore won the "Young Scholar's Competition" award in 2006, in Vienna, Austria. The Competition was a part of the "Horizons of Truth" celebrating the Gödel Centenary 2006. He was an invited speaker at the ICM, Hyderabad 2010, Logic session, where he presented his solution to the problem of constructing an L-space. The L-space was constructed without assuming additional axioms and by combining Todorcevic's rho functions with number theory.

Moore is an editor for the Archive of Mathematical Logic where he handles papers in set theory. He was one of the organizers of the fall 2012 Thematic Program in Forcing and its Applications (Forcing Axioms and their Applications) at the Fields Institute. In 2012, he was elected as a Fellow (Inaugural Class of Fellows) of the American Mathematical Society.
