= Ezra Getzler =

Australian mathematician and mathematical physicist (born 1962)

- Born: February 9, 1962 (age 64); Melbourne, Australia
- Education: Harvard University
- Scientific career
- Fields: Mathematical physics
- Workplaces: Northwestern University
- Thesis: Degree Theory of Wiener Maps and Supersymmetric Quantum Mechanics (1986)
- Doctoral advisor: Arthur Michael Jaffe
- Website: https://sites.northwestern.edu/getzler/

Ezra Getzler (born 9 February 1962 in Melbourne) is an Australian mathematician and mathematical physicist.

== Education and career ==
Getzler studied from 1979 to 1982 at the Australian National University in Canberra (bachelor's degree with honours in 1982). In 1982 he moved to Harvard University with a Fulbright Scholarship; he received his PhD in 1986 under Arthur Jaffe, with a thesis entitled Degree theory for Wiener maps and supersymmetric quantum mechanics.

From 1986 to 1989 he was a Junior Fellow at Harvard. He then moved to the Massachusetts Institute of Technology, where he became assistant professor in 1989 and associate professor in 1993. In 1997 he became associate professor at Northwestern University and since 1999 he is full professor.

He was a guest professor at several universities, including the Max-Planck-Institut für Mathematik in Bonn (1996), the École Normale Supérieure (1992), the Institut Henri Poincaré (2007), the University of Nice Sophia Antipolis, the Imperial College London (2007/8), and the University of Paris VI. In 2002 and in 2003/4 he was at the Institute for Advanced Study.

From 1991 to 1993 a Sloan Research Fellow. In 2012 he became a fellow of the American Mathematical Society.

== Research ==
Getzler is known for his new proof (1983) of the Atiyah–Singer index theorem using supersymmetry, based upon ideas of Luis Álvarez-Gaumé and Edward Witten in mathematical physics. In addition to mathematical physics, he works on algebraic geometry, category theory, and algebraic topology.

== Works ==
- with Nicole Berline, Michèle Vergne, Heat Kernels and Dirac Operators, Springer Verlag, Grundlehren der Mathematischen Wissenschaften, 1992.
- Pseudodifferential operators on supermanifolds and the Atiyah–Singer index theorem, Communications in Mathematical Physics, Vol. 92, 1983, p. 163, Online
- A short proof of the Atiyah–Singer index theorem, Topology 25 (1987), 111–117.
- The local Atiyah–Singer index theorem, in Konrad Osterwalder, Raymond Stora (eds.): Critical phenomena, random systems, gauge theories (Les Houches Lectures 1984), North-Holland, Amsterdam-New York, 1986, pp. 967–974.
- Editor with Mikhail Kapranov: Higher category theory, Workshop Northwestern University 1997, American Mathematical Society 1998.
