= Lamplighter group =

Particular mathematical group

In group theory, the lamplighter group $L$ is the restricted wreath product $\Z_2 \wr \Z$. The name of the group comes from viewing the group as acting on a doubly infinite sequence of street lamps

$$\dots,l_{-1},l_0,l_1,l_2,\dots$$

each of which may be on or off, and a lamplighter standing at some lamp $l_k.$ An equivalent description for this, called the base group $B$ of $L$, is

$$B=\bigoplus_{-\infty}^{\infty}\Z_2,$$

an infinite direct sum of copies of the cyclic group $\Z_2$, where $0$ corresponds to a light that is off and $1$ corresponds to a light that is on, and the direct sum is used to ensure that only finitely many lights are on at once. An element of $\Z$ gives the position of the lamplighter, and $B$ encodes which bulbs are illuminated.

There are two generators for the group: the generator $t$ increments $k$, so that the lamplighter moves to the next lamp ($t^{-1}$ decrements $k$), while the generator $a$ means that the state of lamp $l_k$ is changed (from off to on or from on to off). Group multiplication is done by "following" these operations.

We may assume that only finitely many lamps are lit at any time, since the action of any element of $L$ changes at most finitely many lamps. The number of lamps lit is, however, unbounded. The group action is thus similar to the action of a Turing machine in two ways. The Turing machine has unbounded memory, but has only used a finite amount of memory at any given time. Moreover, the Turing machine's head is analogous to the lamplighter.

== Presentation ==
The standard presentation for the lamplighter group arises from the wreath product structure

$$\langle a, t \mid a^2, [ t^m a t^{-m} , t^n a t^{-n} ], m, n \in \mathbb{Z} \rangle$$,

which may be simplified to

$$\langle a, t \mid a^2, (a t^n a t^{-n})^2, n \in \mathbb{Z} \rangle$$.

The growth rate of the group, the function describing the number of group elements that can be formed as a product of $n$ generators for each $n$, is generally defined with respect to these two generators $a$ and $t$. This is exponential, with the golden ratio as its base, the same rate as the growth of the Fibonacci numbers. In some cases the growth rate is studied with respect to two different generators $a$ and $at$, changing the logarithm of the growth rate by at most a factor of 2.

This presentation is not finite. It has infinitely many relations, as specified by the indices $m$ and $n$. In fact there is no finite presentation for the lamplighter group; that is, it is not finitely presented.

== Matrix representation ==
Allowing $t$ to be a formal variable, the lamplighter group $L$ is isomorphic to the group of matrices

$$\begin{pmatrix}t^k & p \\ 0 & 1 \end{pmatrix},$$

where $k \in \Z$ and $p$ ranges over all polynomials in $\Z_2[t,t^{-1}]$.

Using the presentations above, the isomorphism is given by

$$t \mapsto \begin{pmatrix}t & 0 \\ 0 & 1 \end{pmatrix}, \quad\quad a \mapsto \begin{pmatrix}1 & 1 \\ 0 & 1 \end{pmatrix}.$$

== Properties ==
- $L$ is amenable.
- $L$ is not hyperbolic.
- $L$ is ICC.
- $L$ has trivial Poisson boundary but $\Z_2 \wr \Z^d$ for $d \geq 3$ has nontrivial Poisson boundary.

== Generalizations ==
One can also define lamplighter groups $L_n = \Z_n \wr \Z$, with $n \in \N$, so that "lamps" may have more than just the option of "off" and "on." Higher dimensional versions of these groups of the form $L_n = \Z_n \wr \Z^d$ for a further $d \in \N$ are sometimes also considered.

- Bartholdi, Laurent (2017). "Growth of groups and wreath products". In Ceccherini-Silberstein, Tullio; Salvatori, Maura; Sava-Huss, Ecaterina (eds.). Groups, Graphs and Random Walks (Cortona, 2014). London Mathematical Society Lecture Note Series. Vol. 436. Cambridge University Press. pp. 1–76. ISBN 978-1-316-60440-3. MR 3644003.
- Clay, Matt; Margalit, Dan, eds. (2017). Office Hours with a Geometric Group Theorist. Princeton University Press. ISBN 978-0-691-15866-2. Zbl 1375.20002.
