= Følner sequence =

In mathematics, a Følner sequence for a group is a sequence of sets satisfying a particular condition. If a group has a Følner sequence with respect to its action on itself, the group is amenable. A more general notion of Følner nets can be defined analogously, and is suited for the study of uncountable groups. Følner sequences are named for Erling Følner.

== Definition ==
Given a group $G$ that acts on a countable set $X$, a Følner sequence for the action is a sequence of finite subsets $F_1, F_2, \dots$ of $X$ which exhaust $X$ and which "don't move too much" when acted on by any group element. Precisely,

For every $x\in X$, there exists some $i$ such that $x \in F_j$ for all $j > i$, and
$\lim_{i\to\infty}\frac{|gF_i\mathbin\triangle F_i|}{|F_i|} = 0$ for all group elements $g$ in $G$.

Explanation of the notation used above:

- $gF_i\$ is the result of the set $F_i\$ being acted on the left by $g$. It consists of elements of the form $gf$ for all $f$ in $F_i$.
- $\triangle$ is the symmetric difference operator, i.e., $A\mathbin\triangle B$ is the set of elements in exactly one of the sets $A$ and $B$.
- $|A|$ is the cardinality of a set $A$.

Thus, what this definition says is that for any group element $g$, the proportion of elements of $F_i\$ that are moved away by $g$ goes to 0 as $i$ gets large.

In the setting of a locally compact group acting on a measure space $(X,\mu)$ there is a more general definition. Instead of being finite, the sets are required to have finite, non-zero measure, and so the Følner requirement will be that

- $\lim_{i\to\infty}\frac{\mu(gF_i\mathbin\triangle F_i)}{\mu(F_i)} = 0$,

analogously to the discrete case. The standard case is that of the group acting on itself by left translation, in which case the measure in question is normally assumed to be the Haar measure.

== Examples ==
- Any finite group $G$ trivially has a Følner sequence $F_i=G$ for each $i$.
- Consider the group of integers, acting on itself by addition. Let $F_i$ consist of the integers between $-i$ and $i$. Then $gF_i$ consists of integers between $g-i$ and $g+i$. For large $i$, the symmetric difference has size $2g$, while $F_i$ has size $2i+1$. The resulting ratio is $2g/(2i+1)$, which goes to 0 as $i$ gets large.
- With the original definition of Følner sequence, a group has a Følner sequence if and only if it is countable and amenable.
- A locally compact group has a Følner sequence (with the generalized definition) if and only if it is amenable and second countable.

== Proof of amenability ==
We have a group $G$ and a Følner sequence $F_i$, and we need to define a measure $\mu$ on $G$, which philosophically speaking says how much of $G$ any subset $A$ takes up. The natural definition that uses our Følner sequence would be

$$\mu(A)=\lim_{i\to\infty}{|A\cap F_i|\over|F_i|}.$$

Of course, this limit doesn't necessarily exist. To overcome this technicality, we take an ultrafilter $U$ on the natural numbers that contains intervals $[n,\infty)$. Then we use an ultralimit instead of the regular limit:

$$\mu(A)=U - \lim{|A\cap F_i|\over|F_i|}.$$

It turns out ultralimits have all the properties we need. Namely,

1. $\mu$ is a probability measure. That is, $\mu(G)=U - \lim1=1$, since the ultralimit coincides with the regular limit when it exists.
2. $\mu$ is finitely additive. This is since ultralimits commute with addition just as regular limits do.
3. $\mu$ is left invariant. This is since
  $\left|{|gA\cap F_i|\over|F_i|}-{|A\cap F_i|\over|F_i|}\right| = \left|{|A\cap g^{-1}F_i|\over|F_i|}-{|A\cap F_i|\over|F_i|}\right|$
  $$\leq{|A\cap(g^{-1}F_i\mathbin\triangle F_i)|\over|F_i|}\to0$$

by the Følner sequence definition.
