= Alexei Kostrikin =

Russian mathematician (1929–2000)

Alexei Ivanovich Kostrikin (Russian: Алексей Иванович Кострикин) (12 February 1929 – 22 September 2000) was a Russian mathematician, specializing in algebra and algebraic geometry.

== Life ==
Kostrikin graduated from the Faculty of Mechanics and Mathematics at Moscow State University in 1952. In 1960, he earned a Doctor of Sciences degree under Igor Shafarevich at the Steklov Institute of Mathematics with a thesis on the Burnside problem. He became a faculty member at Moscow State University in 1963.

== Prizes ==
Kostrikin was awarded the USSR State Prize in 1968 for his research on finite groups and Lie algebras and was elected the corresponding member of the USSR Academy of Sciences in 1976.

== Books ==
Alexei Kostrikin published many scientific articles, books and textbooks, including a university textbook about algebra Introduction to algebra, translated into English and other languages.

== Selected publications ==
- Around Burnside, Springer Verlag 1990 2012 pbk reprint
- with Pham Huu Tiep: Orthogonal Decompositions and Integral Lattices, de Gruyter 1994
- with Yuri Manin: Linear algebra and geometry, Gordon and Breach 1989; 1997 pbk edition
- Introduction to Algebra, Springer Verlag 1982 (Russian original 1977)
- Exercises in algebra: a collection of exercises in algebra, linear algebra and geometry, Gordon and Breach 1996
