= Nicole Berline =

French mathematician

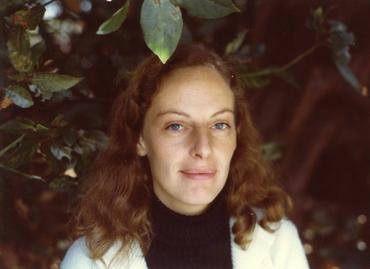
Nicole Berline 1976

Nicole Berline (born 1944, also published as Nicole Conze-Berline) is a French mathematician.

== Life and work ==
Berline studied from 1963 to 1966 at the École normale supérieure de jeunes filles and she was as an exchange student at the Moscow State University in Moscow in 1966/67. In 1967, she taught at the ENS de Jeunes filles and in 1971, she worked for the CNRS (Attachée de recherches). In 1974 she received her doctorate at the University of Paris under the supervision of Jacques Dixmier (Ideaux primitifs dans les algebres enveloppantes). In 1976/77 she was a visiting professor at the University of California, Berkeley. In 1977 she became a professor at the University of Rennes 1 and she has taught at the Ecole Polytechnique since 1984.

She worked in the index theory of elliptic differential operators along the lines of the Atiyah-Singer index theorem and symplectic geometry.

== Publications ==
- With Ezra Getzler, Michèle Vergne, "Heat kernels and Dirac operators", in the series called Principles of mathematical sciences 298, Springer Verlag, 1992, 2004
