= Jacques Dixmier =

French mathematician

- Born: 24 May 1924 (age 102); Saint-Étienne, France
- Education: University of Paris
- Known for: Dixmier condition Dixmier conjecture Dixmier mapping Dixmier problem Dixmier trace
- Awards: Prix de l'État (1962); Prix Ampère (1976); Leroy P. Steele Prize (1992); Émile-Picard-Medaille (2001)
- Scientific career
- Fields: Mathematics
- Workplaces: University of Paris
- Thesis: Étude sur les variétés et les opérateurs de Julia avec quelques applications
- Doctoral advisor: Gaston Julia
- Doctoral students: Alain Connes; Michel Duflo; Michèle Vergne; Nicole Berline

Jacques Dixmier (born 24 May 1924) is a French mathematician. He worked on operator algebras, especially C*-algebras, and wrote several of the standard reference books on them, and introduced the Dixmier trace and the Dixmier mapping.

== Biography ==
Dixmier received his Ph.D. in 1949 from the University of Paris, and his students include Alain Connes.

In 1949 upon the initiative of Jean-Pierre Serre and Pierre Samuel, Dixmier became a member of Bourbaki, in which he made essential contributions to the Bourbaki volume on Lie algebras. After retiring as professor emeritus from the University of Paris VI, he spent five years at the Institut des Hautes Études Scientifiques.

Often, there is made the erroneous claim that Dixmier originated the name von Neumann algebra for the operator algebras introduced by John von Neumann, but Dixmier said in an interview that the name originated from a proposal by Jean Dieudonné.

Dixmier was an invited speaker at the International Congress of Mathematicians in 1966 in Moscow with the talk Espace dual d'une algèbre, ou d'un groupe localement compact and again in 1978 in Helsinki with the talk Algèbres enveloppantes.

== Publications ==
- J. Dixmier, C*-algebras. Translated from the French by Francis Jellett. North-Holland Mathematical Library, Vol. 15. North-Holland Publishing Co., Amsterdam-New York-Oxford, 1977. xiii+492 pp. ISBN 0-7204-0762-1

A translation of Les C*-algèbres et leurs représentations, Gauthier-Villars, 1969.

- Dixmier, Jacques (1996) [1974], Enveloping algebras, Graduate Studies in Mathematics, vol. 11, Providence, R.I.: American Mathematical Society, ISBN 978-0-8218-0560-2, MR 0498740

A translation of Algèbres enveloppantes, Cahiers Scientifiques, Fasc. XXXVII. Gauthier-Villars Éditeur, Paris-Brussels-Montreal, Que., 1974. ii+349 pp.

- J. Dixmier, von Neumann algebras, Translated from the second French edition by F. Jellett. North-Holland Mathematical Library, 27. North-Holland Publishing Co., Amsterdam-New York, 1981. xxxviii+437 pp. ISBN 0-444-86308-7

A translation of Les algèbres d'opérateurs dans l'espace hilbertien: algèbres de von Neumann, Gauthier-Villars (1957), the first book about von Neumann algebras.

=== Books ===
- Dixmier, Jacques (1984). General Topology. Undergraduate Texts in Mathematics. Translated by Berberian, S. K. New York: Springer-Verlag. ISBN 978-0-387-90972-1. OCLC 10277303.

== See also ==
- Dixmier–Ng theorem
- Dixmier problem
- Dixmier conjecture
