= Michèle Vergne =

French mathematician

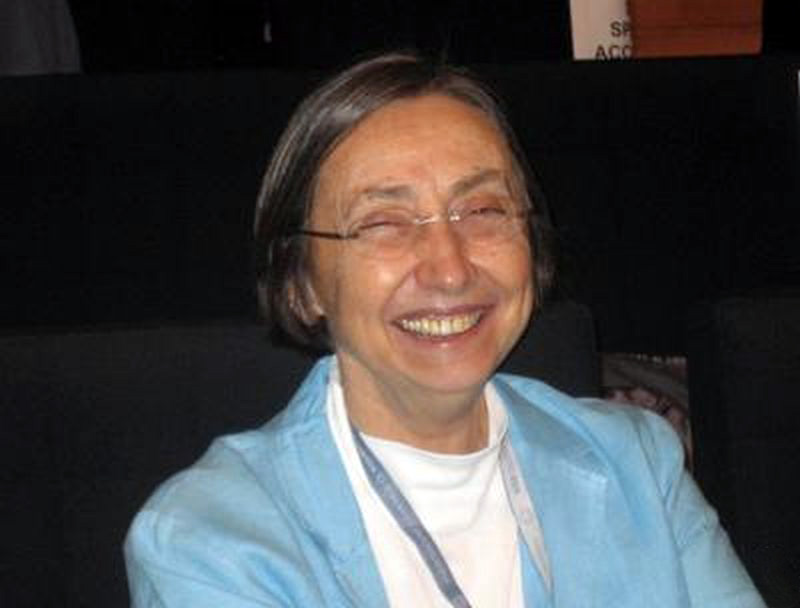
- Michèle Vergne, ICM Madrid 2006
- Born: August 29, 1943 (age 82); L'Isle-Adam, Val-d'Oise
- Occupation: Mathematician
- Known for: Analysis and Representation Theory
- Notable work: Proved a generalized Poisson summation formula

Michèle Vergne (born August 29, 1943, in L’Isle-Adam, Val d´Oise) is a French mathematician, specializing in analysis and representation theory.

== Life and work ==
Michèle Vergne studied from 1962 to 1966 at the École Normal Supérieure de jeunes filles, which today is part of the ENS. She wrote her diploma thesis in 1966 with Claude Chevalley, entitled "Variété des algèbres de Lie nilpotentes" (Variety of Nilpotent Lie Algebras) and her doctoral thesis in 1971 under the supervision of Jacques Dixmier entitled "Recherches sur les groupes et les algèbres de Lie" (Research on Groups and Lie Algebras) at the University of Paris. She is currently Directeur de Recherche at CNRS.

Vergne worked in the construction of unitary representations of Lie groups using coadjoint orbits of the Lie algebras. She proved a generalized Poisson summation formula (called the Poisson-Plancherel formula), which is the integral of a function on adjoint orbits with their Fourier transformation integrals on coadjoint "quantized" orbits.

Further, she studied the index theory of elliptic differential operators and generalizations of this to equivariant cohomology. With Nicole Berline, it became a link between Atiyah-Bott fixed-point formulas and Kirillov character formula in 1985. The theory has applications to physics (e.g., some works of Edward Witten).

In addition she also worked in the geometry of numbers; more specifically, the number of integer points in convex polyhedra.

With Masaki Kashiwara, she formulated a conjecture about the combinatorial structure of the enveloping algebras of Lie algebras.

Since 1997, she is a member of the Académie des sciences. She received the Prix Ampère in 1997. She is a member of The American Academy of Arts and Sciences. In 1992, she gave a plenary lecture at the first European Congress of Mathematics in Paris (Cohomologie equivariante et formules de carácteres). In 2006 she gave a plenary lecture at the International Congress of mathematics in Madrid (Applications of Equivariant Cohomology) and in 1983 she was an invited speaker at the ICM in Warsaw (Formule de Kirilov et indice de l'opérateur de Dirac). In 2008 she was Emmy-Noether - visiting professor at the University of Göttingen. She is a fellow of the American Mathematical Society.

I September 2023 a five day conference,Groups in Action: From Representations and Harmonic Analysis on Lie Groups to Index Theory, was held at the Institut de Mathématiques de Jussieu in honor of her 80th birthday.

Michèle Vergne was married to Victor Kac. They have a daughter, Marianne Kac-Vergne, professor of American civilization at the University of Picardie.

== Selected publications ==
- with G. Lion: The Weil representation, Maslov Index and Theta Series, Birkhäuser 1980
- with Nicole Berline, Ezra Getzler: Heat kernels and Dirac operators, Springer, Grundlehren der mathematischen Wissenschaften, 1992, 2004
- Quantification geometrique et reduction symplectique, Seminar Bourbaki 2000/1
- Représentations unitaires des groupes de Lie résolubles., Seminar Bourbaki, 1973/4
- with Michel Duflo, Jacques Dixmier: Sur la représentation coadjointe d'une algèbre de Lie , Compositio Mathematica 1974
- Applications of Equivariant Cohomology, ICM 2006
