= Erling Følner =

Danish mathematician (1919–1991)

- Born: 18 November 1919; Copenhagen
- Died: 10 October 1991 (aged 71); Hillerød
- Occupation: Mathematician
- Known for: Følner sequence

Erling Haaland Følner (18 November 1919 – 10 October 1991) was a Danish mathematician known for the Følner sequence.

Professor at the Technical University of Denmark (Danmarks Tekniske Højskole, DTH) in the period from 1954 to 1974. Følner published a comprehensive survey of almost periodic functions with Harald Bohr, and continued with further studies on this topic in his doctoral dissertation.

Følner is known internationally for the Følner sequence: a Følner sequence for a group is a sequence of sets satisfying a particular condition. If a group has a Følner sequence with respect to its action on itself, the group is amenable. A more general notion of Følner nets can be defined analogously, and is suited for the study of uncountable groups.

Følner married Harald Bohr's daughter, Ellen Bohr (1923–1972). Their son, architect (and former employee of Jørn Utzon) Per Følner (1945-), co-founded the well reputed architectural firm Fogh & Følner.
