= Higman group =

Mathematical group

In mathematics, the Higman group, introduced by Graham Higman (1951), was the first example of an infinite finitely presented group with no nontrivial finite quotients. The quotient by the maximal proper normal subgroup is a finitely generated infinite simple group. Higman (1974) later found some finitely presented infinite groups G_{n,r} that are simple if n is even and have a simple subgroup of index 2 if n is odd, one of which is one of the Thompson groups.

Higman's group is generated by 4 elements a, b, c, d with the relations

$$a^{-1}ba = b^2,\quad b^{-1}cb = c^2,\quad c^{-1}dc = d^2,\quad d^{-1}ad = a^2.$$
