= Elementary amenable group =

In mathematics, a group is called elementary amenable if it can be built up from finite groups and abelian groups by a sequence of simple operations that result in amenable groups when applied to amenable groups. Since finite groups and abelian groups are amenable, every elementary amenable group is amenable - however, the converse is not true.

Formally, the class of elementary amenable groups is the smallest subclass of the class of all groups that satisfies the following conditions:

- it contains all finite and all abelian groups
- if G is in the subclass and H is isomorphic to G, then H is in the subclass
- it is closed under the operations of taking subgroups, forming quotients, and forming extensions
- it is closed under directed unions.

The Tits alternative implies that any amenable linear group is locally virtually solvable; hence, for linear groups, amenability and elementary amenability coincide.
