= Growth rate (group theory) =

In the mathematical subject of geometric group theory, the growth rate of a group with respect to a symmetric generating set describes how fast a group grows. Every element in the group can be written as a product of generators, and the growth rate counts the number of elements that can be written as a product of length n.

== Definition ==
Suppose G is a finitely generated group; and T is a finite symmetric set of generators (symmetric means that if $x \in T$ then $x^{-1} \in T$). Any element $x \in G$ can be expressed as a word in the T-alphabet

$$x = a_1 \cdot a_2 \cdots a_k \text{ where } a_i\in T.$$

Consider the subset of all elements of G that can be expressed by such a word of length ≤ n

$$B_n(G,T) = \{x\in G \mid x = a_1 \cdot a_2 \cdots a_k \text{ where } a_i\in T \text{ and } k\le n\}.$$

This set is just the closed ball of radius n in the word metric d on G with respect to the generating set T:

$$B_n(G,T) = \{x\in G \mid d(x, e)\le n\}.$$

More geometrically, $B_n(G,T)$ is the set of vertices in the Cayley graph with respect to T that are within distance n of the identity.

Given two nondecreasing positive functions a and b one can say that they are equivalent ($a\sim b$) if there is a constant C such that for all positive integers n,

$$a(n/ C) \leq b(n) \leq a(Cn),\,$$

for example $p^n\sim q^n$ if $p,q>1$.

Then the growth rate of the group G can be defined as the corresponding equivalence class of the function

$$\#(n)=|B_n(G,T)|,$$

where $|B_n(G,T)|$ denotes the number of elements in the set $B_n(G,T)$. Although the function $\#(n)$ depends on the set of generators T its rate of growth does not (see below) and therefore the rate of growth gives an invariant of a group.

The word metric d and therefore sets $B_n(G,T)$ depend on the generating set T. However, any two such metrics are bilipschitz equivalent in the following sense: for finite symmetric generating sets E, F, there is a positive constant C such that

$${1\over C} \ d_F(x,y) \leq d_E(x,y) \leq C \ d_F(x,y).$$

As an immediate corollary of this inequality we get that the growth rate does not depend on the choice of generating set.

== Polynomial and exponential growth ==
If

$$\#(n)\le C(n^k+1)$$

for some $C,k<\infty$ we say that G has a polynomial growth rate. The infimum $k_0$ of such k's is called the order of polynomial growth. According to Gromov's theorem, a group of polynomial growth is a virtually nilpotent group, i.e. it has a nilpotent subgroup of finite index. In particular, the order of polynomial growth $k_0$ has to be a natural number and in fact $\#(n)\sim n^{k_0}$.

If $\#(n)\ge a^n$ for some $a>1$ we say that G has an exponential growth rate. Every finitely generated G has at most exponential growth, i.e. for some $b>1$ we have $\#(n)\le b^n$.

If $\#(n)$ grows more slowly than any exponential function, G has a subexponential growth rate. Any such group is amenable.

== Examples ==
- A free group of finite rank $k > 1$ has exponential growth rate.
- A finite group has constant growth—that is, polynomial growth of order 0—and this includes fundamental groups of manifolds whose universal cover is compact.
- If M is a closed negatively curved Riemannian manifold then its fundamental group $\pi_1(M)$ has exponential growth rate. John Milnor proved this using the fact that the word metric on $\pi_1(M)$ is quasi-isometric to the universal cover of M.
- The free abelian group $\Z^d$ has a polynomial growth rate of order d.
- The discrete Heisenberg group $H_3$ has a polynomial growth rate of order 4. This fact is a special case of the general theorem of Hyman Bass and Yves Guivarch that is discussed in the article on Gromov's theorem.
- The lamplighter group has an exponential growth.
- The existence of groups with intermediate growth, i.e. subexponential but not polynomial was open for many years. The question was asked by Milnor in 1968 and was finally answered in the positive by Rostislav Grigorchuk in 1984. There are still open questions in this area and a complete picture of which orders of growth are possible and which are not is missing.
- The triangle groups include infinitely many finite groups (the spherical ones, corresponding to sphere), three groups of quadratic growth (the Euclidean ones, corresponding to Euclidean plane), and infinitely many groups of exponential growth (the hyperbolic ones, corresponding to the hyperbolic plane).

== See also ==
- Connections to isoperimetric inequalities
