= Tits alternative =

Mathematical theorem in group theory

In mathematics, the Tits alternative, named after Jacques Tits, is an important theorem about the structure of finitely generated linear groups.

== Statement ==
The theorem, proven by Tits, is stated as follows.

Theorem— Let $G$ be a finitely generated linear group over a field. Then two following possibilities occur:

- either $G$ is virtually solvable (i.e., has a solvable subgroup of finite index)
- or it contains a nonabelian free group (i.e., it has a subgroup isomorphic to the free group on two generators).

== Consequences ==
A linear group is not amenable if and only if it contains a non-abelian free group (thus the von Neumann conjecture, while not true in general, holds for linear groups).

The Tits alternative is an important ingredient in the proof of Gromov's theorem on groups of polynomial growth. In fact the alternative essentially establishes the result for linear groups (it reduces it to the case of solvable groups, which can be dealt with by elementary means).

== Generalizations ==
In geometric group theory, a group G is said to satisfy the Tits alternative if for every subgroup H of G either H is virtually solvable or H contains a nonabelian free subgroup (in some versions of the definition this condition is only required to be satisfied for all finitely generated subgroups of G).

Examples of groups satisfying the Tits alternative which are either not linear, or at least not known to be linear, are:

- Hyperbolic groups
- Mapping class groups;
- Out(Fn);
- Certain groups of birational transformations of algebraic surfaces.

Examples of groups not satisfying the Tits alternative are:

- the Grigorchuk group;
- Thompson's group F.

== Proof ==
The proof of the original Tits alternative is by looking at the Zariski closure of $G$ in $\mathrm{GL}_n(k)$. If it is solvable then the group is solvable. Otherwise one looks at the image of $G$ in the Levi component. If it is noncompact then a ping-pong argument finishes the proof. If it is compact then either all eigenvalues of elements in the image of $G$ are roots of unity and then the image is finite, or one can find an embedding of $k$ in which one can apply the ping-pong strategy.

Note that the proof of all generalisations above also rests on a ping-pong argument.
