= Thin group (combinatorial group theory) =

Cayley graphs of the group C_{4} with generators {1} and {1,2} respectively. Out of all possible generators, {1} is the one resulting in the largest girth, meaning its upper bound is finite, and the group is thin. All finite groups have this limitation naturally, as their Cayley graph has a finite number of vertices. Additionally, all cyclic groups have a girth equal to their order.

In mathematics, in the realm of group theory, a group is said to be thin if there is a finite upper bound on the girth of the Cayley graph induced by any finite generating set. The group is called fat if it is not thin.

Given any generating set of the group, we can consider a graph whose vertices are elements of the group with two vertices adjacent if their ratio is in the generating set. The graph is connected and vertex transitive. Paths in the graph correspond to words in the generators.

If the graph has a cycle of a given length, it has a cycle of the same length containing the identity element. Thus, the girth of the graph corresponds to the minimum length of a nontrivial word that reduces to the identity. A nontrivial word is a word that, if viewed as a word in the free group, does not reduce to the identity.

If the graph has no cycles, its girth is set to be infinity.

The girth depends on the choice of generating set. A thin group is a group where the girth has an upper bound for all finite generating sets.

Some facts about thin and fat groups and about girths:

- Every finite group is thin.
- Every free group is fat.
- The girth of a cyclic group equals its order.
- The girth of a noncyclic abelian group is at most 4, because any two elements commute and the commutation relation gives a nontrivial word.
- The girth of the dihedral group is 2.
- Every nilpotent group, and more generally, every solvable group, is thin.
