= Thompson groups =

Three infinite groups introduced by R. Thompson

In mathematics, the Thompson groups (also called Thompson's groups, vagabond groups or chameleon groups) are three groups, commonly denoted $F \subseteq T \subseteq V$, that were introduced by Richard Thompson in some unpublished handwritten notes in 1965 as a possible counterexample to the von Neumann conjecture. Of the three, F is the most widely studied, and is sometimes referred to as the Thompson group or Thompson's group.

The Thompson groups, and F in particular, have a collection of unusual properties that have made them counterexamples to many general conjectures in group theory. All three Thompson groups are infinite but finitely presented. The groups T and V are (rare) examples of infinite but finitely-presented simple groups. The group F is not simple but its derived subgroup [F,F] is and the quotient of F by its derived subgroup is the free abelian group of rank 2. F is totally ordered, has exponential growth, and does not contain a subgroup isomorphic to the free group of rank 2.

It is conjectured that F is not amenable and hence a further counterexample to the long-standing but recently disproved von Neumann conjecture for finitely-presented groups. It is known that F is not elementary amenable.

Higman (1974) introduced an infinite family of finitely presented simple groups, including Thompson's group V as a special case.

== Presentations ==
A finite presentation of F is given by the following expression:

$$\langle A,B \mid\ [AB^{-1},A^{-1}BA] = [AB^{-1},A^{-2}BA^{2}] = \mathrm{id} \rangle$$

where [x,y] is the usual group theory commutator, xyx^{−1}y^{−1}.

Although F has a finite presentation with 2 generators and 2 relations, it is most easily and intuitively described by the infinite presentation:

$$\langle x_0, x_1, x_2, \dots\ \mid\ x_k^{-1} x_n x_k = x_{n+1}\ \mathrm{for}\ k<n \rangle.$$

The two presentations are related by x_{0}=A, x_{n} = A^{1−n}BA^{n−1} for n>0.

== Other representations ==
The Thompson group F is generated by operations like this on binary trees. Here L and T are nodes, but A B and R can be replaced by more general trees.

The group F also has realizations in terms of operations on ordered rooted binary trees, and as a subgroup of the piecewise linear homeomorphisms of the unit interval that preserve orientation and whose non-differentiable points are dyadic rationals and whose slopes are all powers of 2.

The group F can also be considered as acting on the unit circle by identifying the two endpoints of the unit interval, and the group T is then the group of automorphisms of the unit circle obtained by adding the homeomorphism x→x+1/2 mod 1 to F. On binary trees this corresponds to exchanging the two trees below the root. The group V is obtained from T by adding the discontinuous map that fixes the points of the half-open interval [0,1/2) and exchanges [1/2,3/4) and [3/4,1) in the obvious way. On binary trees this corresponds to exchanging the two trees below the right-hand descendant of the root (if it exists).

The Thompson group F is the group of order-preserving automorphisms of the free Jónsson–Tarski algebra on one generator.

== Amenability ==
The conjecture of Thompson that F is not amenable was further popularized by R. Geoghegan—see also Cannon–Floyd–Parry. Its current status is open.

E. Shavgulidze published a paper in 2009 in which he claimed to prove that F is amenable, but an error was found, as is explained in the MR review.

An October 2026 release of over 700 LLM-produced mathematical papers contained a claimed a proof that F is not amenable, with an accompanying formalization in Lean. A preprint with a human-generated simplified proof appeared a week later.

It is known that F is not elementary amenable.

If F is not amenable, then it would be another counterexample to the now disproved von Neumann conjecture for finitely-presented groups, which states that a finitely-presented group is amenable if and only if it does not contain a copy of the free group of rank 2.

== Connections with topology ==
The group F was rediscovered at least twice by topologists during the 1970s. In a paper that was only published much later but was in circulation as a preprint at that time, P. Freyd and A. Heller showed that the shift map on F induces an unsplittable homotopy idempotent on the Eilenberg–MacLane space K(F,1) and that this is universal in an interesting sense. This is explained in detail in Geoghegan's book (see references below). Independently, J. Dydak and P. Minc created a less well-known model of F in connection with a problem in shape theory.

In 1979, R. Geoghegan made four conjectures about F: (1) F has type FP_{∞}; (2) All homotopy groups of F at infinity are trivial; (3) F has no non-abelian free subgroups; (4) F is non-amenable. (1) was proved by K. S. Brown and R. Geoghegan in a strong form: there is a K(F,1) with two cells in each positive dimension. (2) was also proved by Brown and Geoghegan in the sense that the cohomology H*(F,ZF) was shown to be trivial; since a previous theorem of M. Mihalik implies that F is simply connected at infinity, and the stated result implies that all homology at infinity vanishes, the claim about homotopy groups follows. (3) was proved by M. Brin and C. Squier. The status of (4) is discussed above.

It is unknown if F satisfies the Farrell–Jones conjecture. It is even unknown if the Whitehead group of F (see Whitehead torsion) or the projective class group of F (see Wall's finiteness obstruction) is trivial, though it easily shown that F satisfies the strong Bass conjecture.

D. Farley has shown that F acts as deck transformations on a locally finite CAT(0) cubical complex (necessarily of infinite dimension). A consequence is that F satisfies the Baum–Connes conjecture.

== See also ==
- Higman group
- Non-commutative cryptography
