= Alexander Olshanskii =

Soviet and Russian mathematician

- Александр Ольшанский
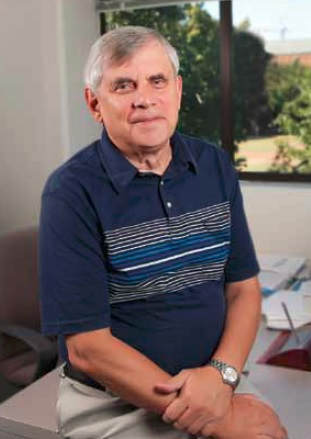
- Born: 19 January 1946 (age 80); Saratov, Russia
- Education: Moscow State University
- Occupation: Mathematician
- Known for: Group theory

Alexander Yu. Olshanskii (Russian: Александр Юрьевич Ольшанский; born 19 January 1946) is a Russian-American mathematician renowned for his contributions to combinatorial and geometric group theory. He is particularly noted for constructing infinite groups with unusual properties and for developing geometric methods in group theory. Olshanskii has also made significant contributions to the study of Lie algebras and algebraic systems.

He served as the Centennial Professor of Mathematics at Vanderbilt University from 1999 until becoming professor emeritus in 2024.

== Early life and education ==
Olshanskii was born in Saratov, Russia, into a family of a military aviation engineer and is one of three brothers. He completed high school in Engels in 1963 and graduated from Moscow State University in 1968 with a B.S. in Mathematics. He earned his Ph.D. in Mathematics in 1971 under the supervision of Alfred Lvovich Shmelkin, with a dissertation titled "Some Questions of the Theory of Group Varieties." He later received his Doctor of Sciences degree (Habilitation) in 1979.

== Academic career ==
From 1970, Olshanskii was a faculty member in the Department of Mechanics and Mathematics at Moscow State University, becoming an associate professor in 1978 and a full professor in 1985. In 1983, he was an invited speaker at the International Congress of Mathematicians in Warsaw, where he presented on geometric methods in combinatorial group theory.

In 1999, he joined Vanderbilt University as the Centennial Professor of Mathematics. He was named a Fellow of the American Mathematical Society in 2014 for his contributions to group theory. He became professor emeritus at Vanderbilt University in 2024.

== Research Contributions ==
Olshanskii's research has significantly influenced combinatorial and geometric group theory. In 1969, while still a graduate student, he resolved a problem posed by Bernard Neumann in 1935 concerning the existence of an infinite system of group identities not equivalent to any finite system. This achievement garnered recognition from Neumann, who was then at Vanderbilt University.

In the late 1970s and early 1980s, Olshanskii introduced graded van Kampen diagrams, a refinement of the classical van Kampen diagrams. Using this technique, he constructed the so-called Tarski monster groups: infinite groups of bounded exponent in which every proper subgroup is cyclic. These constructions provided counterexamples to several longstanding conjectures in group theory, including the von Neumann conjecture.

In 1980, he constructed a counterexample to the von Neumann–Day problem, demonstrating the existence of non-amenable groups without non-cyclic free subgroups.

Olshanskii also provided a new geometric proof of the Novikov--Adyan theorems addressing the Burnside problem. His proof for large odd exponents was notably concise—32 pages compared to the original's 300—and is still considered the most succinct.

His work has influenced the development of hyperbolic groups, a concept central to geometric group theory. Olshanskii extended his methods to study small cancellation theory and van Kampen diagrams over hyperbolic groups, and investigated factor groups of such groups.

In recent years, Olshanskii has focused on asymptotic invariants of groups, such as Dehn functions, distortion, and relative subgroup growth. These invariants are connected to the complexity of algorithmic problems in group theory. In collaboration with M. Birget, E. Rips, and M. Sapir, he developed a geometric criterion for determining when the word problem in a finitely presented group can be solved in nondeterministic polynomial time.

Olshanskii has authored over 100 scientific papers, including the influential monograph Geometry of Defining Relations in Groups.

== Honors and awards ==
- Invited Speaker at the International Congress of Mathematicians (1983)
- Maltsev Prize of the Russian Academy of Sciences (2000)
- Fellow of the American Mathematical Society (2014)
- The Moscow Mathematical Society award (1969)
