= Tarski monster group =

Type of infinite group in group theory

In the area of modern algebra known as group theory, a Tarski monster group, named for Alfred Tarski, is an infinite group such that every proper subgroup, other than the identity subgroup, is a cyclic group of order p, for a fixed prime number p. A Tarski monster group is necessarily simple. It was shown by Alexander Yu. Olshanskii in 1979 that Tarski groups exist, and that there is a Tarski p-group for every prime p > 10^{75}. They are a source of counterexamples to conjectures in group theory, most importantly to Burnside's problem and the von Neumann conjecture.

== Definition ==
A Tarski group is an infinite group such that all proper subgroups have prime power order. Such a group is then a Tarski monster group if there is a prime $p$ such that every non-trivial proper subgroup has order $p$.

An extended Tarski group is a group $G$ that has a normal subgroup $N$ whose quotient group $G/N$ is a Tarski group, and any subgroup $H$ is either contained in or contains $N$.

A Tarski Super Monster (or TSM) is an infinite simple group such that all proper subgroups are abelian, and is more generally called a Perfect Tarski Super Monster when the group is perfect instead of simple. There are TSM groups which are not Tarski monsters.

== Properties ==
As every group of prime order is cyclic, every proper subgroup of a Tarski monster group is cyclic. As a consequence, the intersection of any two different proper subgroups of a Tarski monster group must be the trivial group.

- Every Tarski monster group is generated by any two elements such that neither is a power of the other, and two such elements do not commute.
- If $G$ is a Tarski monster group, then $G$ is simple. If $N\trianglelefteq G$ and $U\leq G$ is any subgroup distinct from $N$ the subgroup $NU$ would have $p^2$ elements.
- The construction of Olshanskii shows in fact that there are continuum-many non-isomorphic Tarski Monster groups for each prime $p>10^{75}$.
- Tarski monster groups are examples of non-amenable groups not containing any free subgroups.
