= Mahlon Marsh Day =

American mathematician (1913–1992)

- Born: November 24, 1913
- Died: 1992 (aged 78–79)
- Education: Brown University
- Scientific career
- Fields: Mathematics
- Workplaces: University of Illinois Urbana-Champaign (1940-1983)
- Thesis: Regularity of Function-to-function Transformations, Operations in Banach Spaces (1939)
- Doctoral advisor: Clarence Raymond Adams

Mahlon Marsh Day (1913–1992) was an American mathematician, who specialized in functional analysis, geometry of linear spaces and amenable semigroups.

== Career ==
In 1939 he graduated from Brown University. He became a member of the Institute for Advanced Study in the years 1939-40 and later in 1948–49. In most of his career, between the years 1940–83, he was a professor of mathematics in University of Illinois at Urbana-Champaign. In June 1983, a conference named "the Geometry of Normed Linear Spaces" was held in honor of Day at the University of Illinois at Urbana-Champaign. A proceedings issue to the conference was published in Contemporary Mathematics. In the preface for this proceedings issue, Day was described as "the first American mathematician to study normed spaces from a geometric standpoint". His monograph "Normed Linear Spaces" from 1973 is highly cited and considered to be classical in the field. In the field of amenable semigroups, his work under this name, is highly cited and considered fundamental to the field. He served as an editor of Illinois Journal of Mathematics in the years 1968-73 and 1981–85.

== Selected publications ==
- Day, M. M. (1957). Amenable semigroups. Illinois Journal of Mathematics, 1(4), 509–544.
- Day, M. M. (1973). Normed linear spaces. In Normed Linear Spaces (pp. 27–52). Springer, Berlin, Heidelberg.
- R. G. Bartle, N. T. Peck, A. L. Peressini, J. J. Uhl (Editors). Geometry of Normed Linear Spaces. Contemporary Mathematics. Volume: 52; 1986; 171 pp. Book front matter.
