= Thin group (algebraic group theory) =

In algebraic group theory, a thin group is a discrete Zariski-dense subgroup of G(R) that has infinite covolume, where G is a semisimple algebraic group over the reals. This is in contrast to a lattice, which is a discrete subgroup of finite covolume.

The theory of "group expansion" (expander graph properties of related Cayley graphs) for particular thin groups has been applied to arithmetic properties of Apollonian circles and in Zaremba's conjecture.
