= Nicolas Monod =

Swiss mathematician

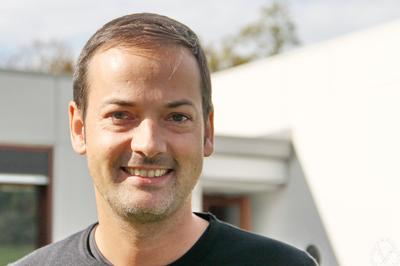
Monod at Oberwolfach in 2014

Nicolas Monod is a professor at École Polytechnique Fédérale de Lausanne (EPFL) and known for work on bounded cohomology, ergodic theory, geometry (CAT(0) spaces), locally compact groups and amenability.

He was born in Montreux, Switzerland. He obtained his PhD from ETH Zurich in 2001 with thesis "Continuous Bounded Cohomology of Locally Compact Groups" written under the direction of Marc Burger.

== Career ==
Monod is a Fellow of the American Mathematical Society. He has been awarded the Gauss Lectureship and the Berwick Prize, and was an invited speaker at the International Congress of Mathematicians in 2006. He was one of the youngest Advanced Investigator awardees in the history of the European Research Council.

Monod was the president of the Swiss Mathematical Society from 2014 to 2015 and was the director of the Bernoulli Center at EPFL from 2014 to 2021.
