= Virtually =

Mathematical concept

In mathematics, especially in the area of abstract algebra that studies infinite groups, the adverb virtually is used to modify a property so that it need only hold for a subgroup of finite index. Given a property P, the group G is said to be virtually P if there is a finite index subgroup $H \le G$ such that H has property P.

Common uses for this would be when P is abelian, nilpotent, solvable or free. For example, virtually solvable groups are one of the two alternatives in the Tits alternative, while Gromov's theorem states that the finitely generated groups with polynomial growth are precisely the finitely generated virtually nilpotent groups.

This terminology is also used when P is just another group. That is, if G and H are groups then G is virtually H if G has a subgroup K of finite index in G such that K is isomorphic to H.

In particular, a group is virtually trivial if and only if it is finite. Two groups are virtually equal if and only if they are commensurable.

== Examples ==
=== Virtually abelian ===
The following groups are virtually abelian.

- Any abelian group.
- Any semidirect product $N\rtimes H$ where N is abelian and H is finite. (For example, any generalized dihedral group.)
- Any semidirect product $N\rtimes H$ where N is finite and H is abelian.
- Any finite group (since the trivial subgroup is abelian).

=== Virtually nilpotent ===
- Any group that is virtually abelian.
- Any nilpotent group.
- Any semidirect product $N\rtimes H$ where N is nilpotent and H is finite.
- Any semidirect product $N\rtimes H$ where N is finite and H is nilpotent.

Gromov's theorem says that a finitely generated group is virtually nilpotent if and only if it has polynomial growth.

=== Virtually free ===
- Any free group.
- Any finite group (since the trivial subgroup is the free group on the empty set of generators).
- Any virtually cyclic group. (Either it is finite in which case it falls into the above case, or it is infinite and contains $\Z$ as a subgroup.)
- Any semidirect product $N\rtimes H$ where N is free and H is finite.
- Any semidirect product $N\rtimes H$ where N is finite and H is free.
- Any free product $H*K$, where H and K are both finite. (For example, the modular group $\operatorname{PSL}(2,\Z)$.)

It follows from Stalling's theorem that any torsion-free virtually free group is free.

=== Others ===
The free group $F_2$ on 2 generators is virtually $F_n$ for any $n\ge 2$ as a consequence of the Nielsen–Schreier theorem and the Schreier index formula.

The group $\operatorname{O}(n)$ is virtually connected as $\operatorname{SO}(n)$ has index 2 in it.
