= Amenable group =

Locally compact topological group with an invariant averaging operation

In mathematics, an amenable group is a locally compact topological group G carrying a kind of averaging operation on bounded functions that is invariant under translation by group elements. The original definition, in terms of a finitely additive measure (or mean) on subsets of G, was introduced by John von Neumann in 1929 under the German name "messbar" ("measurable" in English, although nowadays German mathematicians use the term "Mittelbare Gruppe") in response to the Banach–Tarski paradox. In 1949 Mahlon M. Day introduced the English translation "amenable", apparently as a pun on "mean". (Note: Day's first published use of the word is in his abstract for an AMS summer meeting in 1949. Many textbooks on amenability, such as Volker Runde's, suggest that Day chose the word as a pun.)

The critical step in the Banach–Tarski paradox construction is to find inside the rotation group SO(3) a free subgroup on two generators. Amenable groups cannot contain such groups, and do not allow this kind of paradoxical construction.

Amenability has many equivalent definitions. In the field of analysis, the definition is in terms of linear functionals. An intuitive way to understand this version is that the support of the regular representation is the whole space of irreducible representations.

In discrete group theory, where G has the discrete topology, a simpler definition is used. In this setting, a group is amenable if one can say what proportion of G any given subset takes up. For example, any subgroup of the group of integers $(\Z, +)$ is generated by some integer $p \geq 0$. If $p = 0$ then the subgroup takes up 0 proportion. Otherwise, it takes up $1/p$ of the whole group. Even though both the group and the subgroup has infinitely many elements, there is a well-defined sense of proportion.

If a group has a Følner sequence then it is automatically amenable.

== Definition for locally compact groups ==
Let G be a locally compact Hausdorff group. Then it is well known that it possesses a unique (up to scale) left or right translation-invariant nontrivial ring measure, the Haar measure. (This is a Borel regular measure when G is second-countable; the left and right Haar measures coincide when G is compact.) Consider the Banach space L^{∞}(G) of essentially bounded measurable functions within this measure space (which is clearly independent of the scale of the Haar measure).

Definition 1. A linear functional Λ in Hom(L^{∞}(G), R) is said to be a mean if Λ has norm 1 and is non-negative, i.e. f ≥ 0 a.e. implies Λ(f) ≥ 0.

Definition 2. A mean Λ in Hom(L^{∞}(G), R) is said to be left-invariant (respectively right-invariant) if Λ(g·f) = Λ(f) (respectively Λ(f·g) = Λ(f)) for all g in G and f in L^{∞}(G) with respect to the left (respectively right) translation action of g·f(x) = f(g^{−1}x) (respectively f·g(x) = f(xg^{−1})).

Definition 3. A locally compact Hausdorff group is called amenable if it admits a left- (or right-)invariant mean.

By identifying Hom(L^{∞}(G), R) with the space of finitely-additive Borel measures which are absolutely continuous with respect to the Haar measure on G (a ba space), the terminology becomes more natural: a mean in Hom(L^{∞}(G), R) induces a left-invariant, finitely additive Borel measure on G which gives the whole group weight 1.

=== Example ===
As an example for compact groups, consider the circle group. The graph of a typical function f ≥ 0 looks like a jagged curve above a circle, which can be made by tearing off the end of a paper tube. The linear functional would then average the curve by snipping off some paper from one place and gluing it to another place, creating a flat top again. This is the invariant mean, i.e. the average value

$$\Lambda(f)=\int_{\mathbb{R}/\mathbb{Z}} f \ d\lambda$$

where $\lambda$ is Lebesgue measure.

Left-invariance would mean that rotating the tube does not change the height of the flat top at the end. That is, only the shape of the tube matters. Combined with linearity, positivity, and norm-1, this is sufficient to prove that the invariant mean we have constructed is unique.

== Equivalent conditions for amenability ==
Pier (1984) contains a comprehensive account of the conditions on a second countable locally compact group G that are equivalent to amenability:

- Existence of a left (or right) invariant mean on L^{∞}(G). The original definition.
- Existence of left-invariant states. There is a left-invariant state on any separable left-invariant unital C*-subalgebra of the bounded continuous functions on G.
- Fixed-point property. Any action of the group by continuous affine transformations on a compact convex subset of a (separable) locally convex topological vector space has a fixed point. For locally compact abelian groups, this property is satisfied as a result of the Markov–Kakutani fixed-point theorem.
- Irreducible dual. All irreducible representations are weakly contained in the left regular representation λ on L^{2}(G).
- Trivial representation. The trivial representation of G is weakly contained in the left regular representation.
- Godement condition. Every bounded positive-definite measure μ on G satisfies μ(1) ≥ 0. Valette improved this criterion by showing that it is sufficient to ask that, for every continuous positive-definite compactly supported function f on G, the function Δ^{–1/2}f has non-negative integral with respect to Haar measure, where Δ denotes the modular function.
- Day's asymptotic invariance condition. There is a sequence of integrable non-negative functions φ_{n} with integral 1 on G such that λ(g)φ_{n} − φ_{n} tends to 0 in the weak topology on L^{1}(G).
- Reiter's condition. For every finite (or compact) subset F of G there is an integrable non-negative function φ with integral 1 such that λ(g)φ − φ is arbitrarily small in L^{1}(G) for g in F.
- Dixmier's condition. For every finite (or compact) subset F of G there is unit vector f in L^{2}(G) such that λ(g)f − f is arbitrarily small in L^{2}(G) for g in F.
- Glicksberg−Reiter condition. For any f in L^{1}(G), the distance between 0 and the closed convex hull in L^{1}(G) of the left translates λ(g)f equals |∫f|.
- Følner condition. For every finite (or compact) subset F of G there is a measurable subset U of G with finite positive Haar measure such that m(U Δ gU)/m(U) is arbitrarily small for g in F.
- Leptin's condition. For every finite (or compact) subset F of G there is a measurable subset U of G with finite positive Haar measure such that m(FU Δ U)/m(U) is arbitrarily small.
- Kesten's condition. Left convolution on L^{2}(G) by a symmetric probability measure on G gives an operator of operator norm 1.
- Johnson's cohomological condition. The Banach algebra A = L^{1}(G) is amenable as a Banach algebra, i.e. any bounded derivation of A into the dual of a Banach A-bimodule is inner.

Other equivalent characterizations include (valid for second countable locally compact G):

- Gheysens−Monod's bounded orbit condition. Every continuous affine action action of G on a Hilbert space with a bounded orbit has a fixed point.

== Case of discrete groups ==
The definition of amenability is simpler in the case of a discrete group, i.e. a group equipped with the discrete topology.

Definition. A discrete group G is amenable if there is a finitely additive measure (also called a mean)—a function that assigns to each subset of G a number from 0 to 1—such that

1. The measure is a probability measure: the measure of the whole group G is 1.
2. The measure is finitely additive: given finitely many disjoint subsets of G, the measure of the union of the sets is the sum of the measures.
3. The measure is left-invariant: given a subset A and an element g of G, the measure of A equals the measure of gA. (gA denotes the set of elements ga for each element a in A. That is, each element of A is translated on the left by g.)

This definition can be summarized thus: G is amenable if it has a finitely-additive left-invariant probability measure. Given a subset A of G, the measure can be thought of as answering the question: what is the probability that a random element of G is in A?

It is a fact that this definition is equivalent to the definition in terms of L^{∞}(G).

Having a measure μ on G allows us to define integration of bounded functions on G. Given a bounded function f: G → R, the integral

$$\int_G f\,d\mu$$

is defined as in Lebesgue integration. (Note that some of the properties of the Lebesgue integral fail here, since our measure is only finitely additive.)

If a group has a left-invariant measure $\mu$, it automatically has a bi-invariant one, which can be defined as

$$\nu(A) = \int_{g\in G}\!\!\mu (Ag) \, d\mu.$$

The equivalent conditions for amenability also become simpler in the case of a countable discrete group Γ. For such a group the following conditions are equivalent:

- Γ is amenable.
- If Γ acts by isometries on a (separable) Banach space E, leaving a weakly closed convex subset C of the closed unit ball of E* invariant, then Γ has a fixed point in C.
- There is a left invariant norm-continuous functional μ on ℓ^{∞}(Γ) with μ(1) = 1 (this requires the axiom of choice).
- There is a left invariant state μ on any left invariant separable unital C*-subalgebra of ℓ^{∞}(Γ).
- There is a set of probability measures μ_{n} on Γ such that ||g · μ_{n} − μ_{n}||_{1} tends to 0 for each g in Γ (M.M. Day).
- There are unit vectors x_{n} in ℓ^{2}(Γ) such that ||g · x_{n} − x_{n}||_{2} tends to 0 for each g in Γ (J. Dixmier).
- There are finite subsets S_{n} of Γ such that |g · S_{n} Δ S_{n}| / |S_{n}| tends to 0 for each g in Γ (Følner).
- If μ is a symmetric probability measure on Γ with support generating Γ, then convolution by μ defines an operator of norm 1 on ℓ^{2}(Γ) (Kesten).
- If Γ acts by isometries on a (separable) Banach space E and f in ℓ^{∞}(Γ, E*) is a bounded 1-cocycle, i.e. f(gh) = f(g) + g·f(h), then f is a 1-coboundary, i.e. f(g) = g·φ − φ for some φ in E* (B.E. Johnson).
- The reduced group C*-algebra (see the reduced group C*-algebra C_{r}*(G)) is nuclear.
- The reduced group C*-algebra is quasidiagonal (J. Rosenberg, A. Tikuisis, S. White, W. Winter).
- The von Neumann group algebra (see von Neumann algebras associated to groups) of Γ is hyperfinite (A. Connes).

Note that A. Connes also proved that the von Neumann group algebra of any connected locally compact group is hyperfinite, so the last condition no longer applies in the case of connected groups.

Amenability is related to spectral theory of certain operators. For instance, the fundamental group of a closed Riemannian manifold is amenable if and only if the bottom of the spectrum of the Laplacian on the L2-space of the universal cover of the manifold is 0.

== Properties ==
- Every (closed) subgroup of an amenable group is amenable.
- Every quotient of an amenable group is amenable.
- A group extension of an amenable group by an amenable group is again amenable. In particular, finite direct product of amenable groups are amenable, although infinite products need not be.
- Direct limits of amenable groups are amenable. In particular, if a group can be written as a directed union of amenable subgroups, then it is amenable.
- Amenable groups are unitarizable; the converse is an open problem.
- Countable discrete amenable groups obey the Ornstein isomorphism theorem.

== Examples ==
- Finite groups are amenable. Use the counting measure with the discrete definition. More generally, compact groups are amenable. The Haar measure is an invariant mean (unique taking total measure 1).
- The group of integers is amenable (a sequence of intervals of length tending to infinity is a Følner sequence). The existence of a shift-invariant, finitely additive probability measure on the group Z also follows easily from the Hahn–Banach theorem this way. Let S be the shift operator on the sequence space ℓ^{∞}(Z), which is defined by (Sx)_{i} = x_{i+1} for all x ∈ ℓ^{∞}(Z), and let u ∈ ℓ^{∞}(Z) be the constant sequence u_{i} = 1 for all i ∈ Z. Any element y of the subspace Y = {Sx - x : x ∈ ℓ^{∞}(Z)} has a distance greater than or equal to 1 from u (otherwise y_{i} = x_{i+1} - x_{i} would be positive and bounded away from zero, so x_{i} could not be bounded). This implies that there is a well-defined norm-1 linear form on the subspace Ru + Y taking tu + y to t. By the Hahn–Banach theorem, this form admits a norm-1 linear extension to all of ℓ^{∞}(Z), which is by construction a shift-invariant finitely additive probability measure on Z.
- If every conjugacy class in a locally compact group has compact closure, then the group is amenable. Examples of groups with this property include compact groups, locally compact abelian groups, and discrete groups with finite conjugacy classes.
- By the direct limit property above, a group is amenable if all its finitely generated subgroups are. That is, locally amenable groups are amenable.
  - By the fundamental theorem of finitely generated abelian groups, it follows that abelian groups are amenable.
- It follows from the extension property above that a group is amenable if it has a finite index amenable subgroup. That is, virtually amenable groups are amenable.
- Furthermore, it follows that all solvable groups are amenable.

All examples above are elementary amenable. The first class of examples below can be used to exhibit non-elementary amenable examples thanks to the existence of groups of intermediate growth.

- Finitely generated groups of subexponential growth are amenable. A suitable subsequence of balls will provide a Følner sequence.
- Finitely generated infinite simple groups cannot be obtained by bootstrap constructions as used to construct elementary amenable groups. Since there exist such simple groups that are amenable, due to Juschenko and Monod, this provides again non-elementary amenable examples.

== Nonexamples ==
If a countable discrete group contains a (non-abelian) free subgroup on two generators, then it is not amenable. The converse to this statement is the so-called von Neumann conjecture, which was disproved by Olshanskii in 1980 using his Tarski monsters. Adyan subsequently showed that free Burnside groups are non-amenable: since they are periodic, they cannot contain the free group on two generators. These groups are finitely generated, but not finitely presented. However, in 2002 Sapir and Olshanskii found finitely presented counterexamples: non-amenable finitely presented groups that have a periodic normal subgroup with quotient the integers.

For finitely generated linear groups, however, the von Neumann conjecture is true by the Tits alternative: every subgroup of GL(n,k) with k a field either has a normal solvable subgroup of finite index (and therefore is amenable) or contains the free group on two generators. Although Tits' proof used algebraic geometry, Guivarc'h later found an analytic proof based on V. Oseledets' multiplicative ergodic theorem. Analogues of the Tits alternative have been proved for many other classes of groups, such as fundamental groups of 2-dimensional simplicial complexes of non-positive curvature.

== See also ==
- Uniformly bounded representation
- Kazhdan's property (T)
- Von Neumann conjecture

== Sources ==
- Ballmann, Werner; Brin, Michael (1995), "Orbihedra of nonpositive curvature", Publications Mathématiques de l'Institut des Hautes Études Scientifiques, 82: 169–209, doi:10.1007/BF02698640
- Bowen, Lewis (2012). "Every countably infinite group is almost Ornstein". Dynamical Systems and Group Actions. Contemporary Mathematics. Vol. 567. pp. 67–78. arXiv:1103.4424. doi:10.1090/conm/567.
- Brooks, Robert (1981). "The fundamental group and the spectrum of the Laplacian". Commentarii Mathematici Helvetici. 56: 581–598. doi:10.1007/bf02566228.
- Day, M. M. (1949). "Means on semigroups and groups". Bulletin of the American Mathematical Society. 55 (11): 1054–1055.
- Dixmier, Jacques (1977), C*-algebras (translated from the French by Francis Jellett), North-Holland Mathematical Library, vol. 15, North-Holland
- Greenleaf, F.P. (1969), Invariant Means on Topological Groups and Their Applications, Van Nostrand Reinhold
- Guivarc'h, Yves (1990), "Produits de matrices aléatoires et applications aux propriétés géometriques des sous-groupes du groupes linéaire", Ergodic Theory and Dynamical Systems (in French), 10 (3): 483–512, doi:10.1017/S0143385700005708
- Juschenko, Kate; Monod, Nicolas (2013), "Cantor systems, piecewise translations and simple amenable groups", Annals of Mathematics, 178 (2): 775–787, arXiv:1204.2132, doi:10.4007/annals.2013.178.2.7
- Leptin, H. (1968), "Zur harmonischen Analyse klassenkompakter Gruppen", Invent. Math., 5 (4): 249–254, Bibcode:1968InMat...5..249L, doi:10.1007/bf01389775
- von Neumann, J (1929), "Zur allgemeinen Theorie des Maßes" (PDF), Fundamenta Mathematicae, 13 (1): 73–111, doi:10.4064/fm-13-1-73-116
- Olshanskii, Alexander Yu; Sapir, Mark V. (2002), "Non-amenable finitely presented torsion-by-cyclic groups", Publ. Math. Inst. Hautes Études Sci., 96: 43–169, arXiv:math/0208237, doi:10.1007/s10240-002-0006-7
- Ornstein, Donald S.; Weiss, Benjamin (1987). "Entropy and isomorphism theorems for actions of amenable groups". Journal d'Analyse Mathématique. 48: 1–141. doi:10.1007/BF02790325.
- Pier, Jean-Paul (1984), Amenable locally compact groups, Pure and Applied Mathematics, Wiley, Zbl 0621.43001
- Runde, V. (2002), Lectures on Amenability, Lecture Notes in Mathematics, vol. 1774, Springer, ISBN 978-354042852-7
- Sunada, Toshikazu (1989), "Unitary representations of fundamental groups and the spectrum of twisted Laplacians", Topology, 28 (2): 125–132, doi:10.1016/0040-9383(89)90015-3
- Takesaki, M. (2001), Theory of Operator Algebras I, Springer, ISBN 978-354042248-8
- Takesaki, M. (2002), Theory of Operator Algebras II, Springer, ISBN 978-354042914-2
- Takesaki, M. (2013), Theory of Operator Algebras III, Springer, ISBN 978-366210453-8
- Tits, J. (1972), "Free subgroups in linear groups", J. Algebra, 20 (2): 250–270, doi:10.1016/0021-8693(72)90058-0
- Valette, Alain (1998), "On Godement's characterisation of amenability" (PDF), Bull. Austral. Math. Soc., 57: 153–158, doi:10.1017/s0004972700031506
