= Burnside problem =

If G is a finitely generated group with exponent n, is G necessarily finite?

In mathematics, the Burnside problem asks whether a finitely generated group in which every element has finite order must necessarily be a finite group. It was posed by William Burnside in 1902, making it one of the oldest questions in group theory, and was influential in the development of combinatorial group theory. It is known to have a negative answer in general, as Evgeny Golod and Igor Shafarevich provided a counter-example in 1964. The problem has many refinements and variants that differ in the additional conditions imposed on the orders of the group elements (see bounded and restricted below). Some of these variants are still open questions.

== Brief history ==
Initial work pointed towards the affirmative answer. For example, if a group G is finitely generated and the order of each element of G is a divisor of 4, then G is finite. Moreover, A. I. Kostrikin was able to prove in 1958 that among the finite groups with a given number of generators and a given prime exponent, there exists a largest one. This provides a solution for the restricted Burnside problem for the case of prime exponent. (Later, in 1989, Efim Zelmanov was able to solve the restricted Burnside problem for an arbitrary exponent.) Issai Schur had shown in 1911 that any finitely generated periodic group that was a subgroup of the group of invertible n × n complex matrices was finite; he used this theorem to prove the Jordan–Schur theorem.

Nevertheless, the general answer to the Burnside problem turned out to be negative. In 1964, Golod and Shafarevich constructed an infinite group of Burnside type without assuming that all elements have uniformly bounded order. In 1968, Pyotr Novikov and Sergei Adian supplied a negative solution to the bounded exponent problem for all odd exponents larger than 4381 which was later improved to an odd exponent larger than 665 by Adian. In 1982, A. Yu. Ol'shanskii found some striking counterexamples for sufficiently large odd exponents (greater than 10^{10}), and supplied a considerably simpler proof based on geometric ideas.

The case of even exponents turned out to be much harder to settle. In 1992, S. V. Ivanov announced the negative solution for sufficiently large even exponents divisible by a large power of 2 (detailed proofs were published in 1994 and occupied some 300 pages). Later joint work of Ol'shanskii and Ivanov established a negative solution to an analogue of the Burnside problem for hyperbolic groups, provided the exponent is sufficiently large. By contrast, when the exponent is small and different from 2, 3, 4 and 6, very little is known.

== General Burnside problem ==
A group G is called periodic (or torsion) if every element has finite order; in other words, for each g in G, there exists some positive integer n such that g^{n} = 1. Clearly, every finite group is periodic. There exist easily defined groups such as the p^{∞}-group which are infinite periodic groups; but the latter group cannot be finitely generated.

General Burnside problem. If G is a finitely generated, periodic group, then is G necessarily finite?

This question was answered in the negative in 1964 by Evgeny Golod and Igor Shafarevich, who gave an example of an infinite p-group that is finitely generated (see Golod–Shafarevich theorem). However, the orders of the elements of this group are not a priori bounded by a single constant.

== Bounded Burnside problem ==
Unsolved problem in mathematics
For which m and n is $B(m, n)$ finite?
More unsolved problems in mathematics

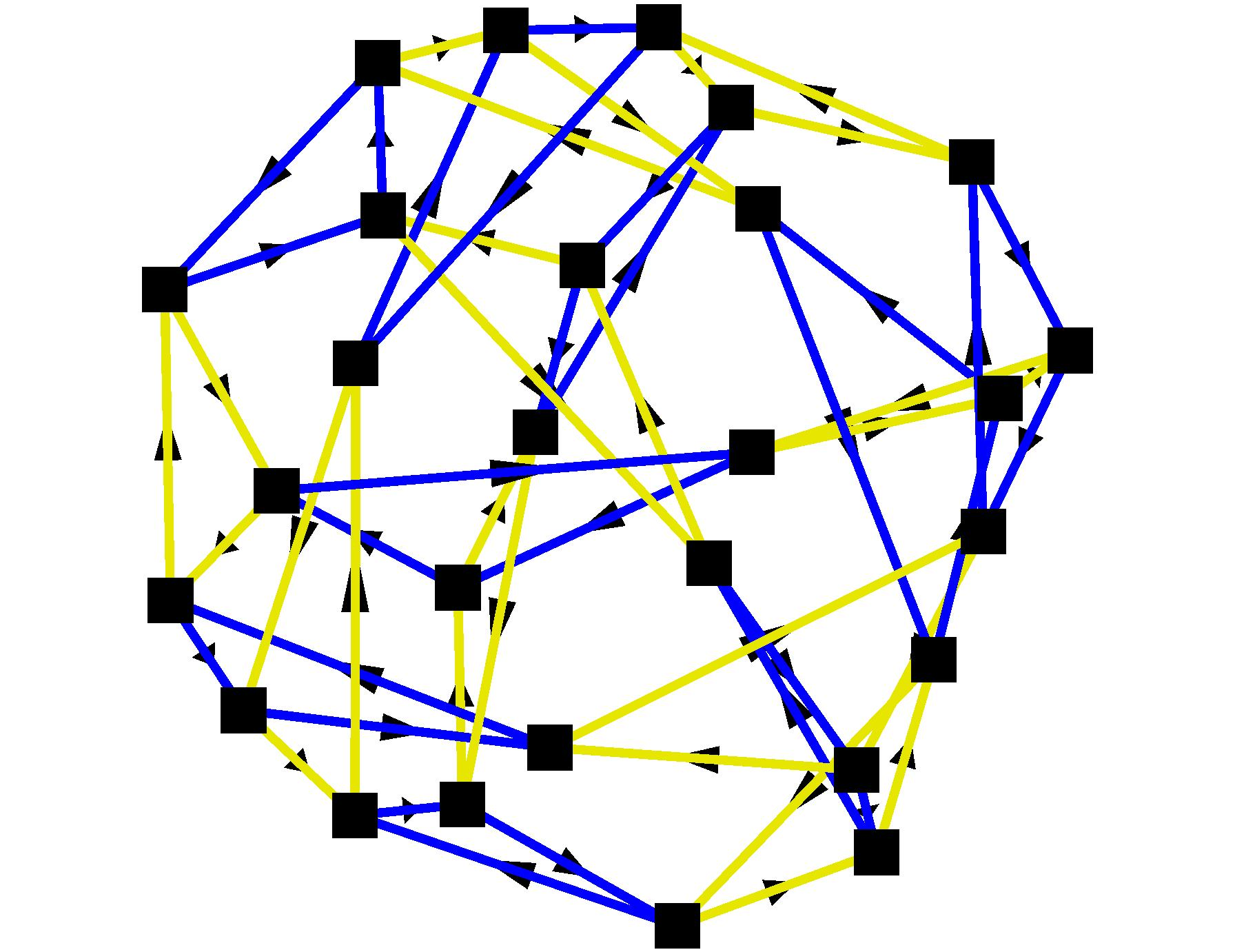
The Cayley graph of the 27-element free Burnside group of rank 2 and exponent 3.

Part of the difficulty with the general Burnside problem is that the requirements of being finitely generated and periodic give very little information about the possible structure of a group. Therefore, we pose more requirements on G. Consider a periodic group G with the additional property that there exists a least integer n such that for all g in G, g^{n} = 1. A group with this property is said to be periodic with bounded exponent n, or just a group with exponent n. The Burnside problem for groups with bounded exponent asks:

Burnside problem I. If G is a finitely generated group with exponent n, is G necessarily finite?

It turns out that this problem can be restated as a question about the finiteness of groups in a particular family. The free Burnside group of rank m and exponent n, denoted B(m, n), is a group with m distinguished generators x_{1}, ..., x_{m} in which the identity x^{n} = 1 holds for all elements x, and which is the "largest" group satisfying these requirements. More precisely, the characteristic property of B(m, n) is that, given any group G with m generators g_{1}, ..., g_{m} and of exponent n, there is a unique homomorphism from B(m, n) to G that maps the ith generator x_{i} of B(m, n) into the ith generator g_{i} of G. In the language of group presentations, the free Burnside group B(m, n) has m generators x_{1}, ..., x_{m} and the relations x^{n} = 1 for each word x in x_{1}, ..., x_{m}, and any group G with m generators of exponent n is obtained from it by imposing additional relations. The existence of the free Burnside group and its uniqueness up to an isomorphism are established by standard techniques of group theory. Thus if G is any finitely generated group of exponent n, then G is a homomorphic image of B(m, n), where m is the number of generators of G. The Burnside problem for groups with bounded exponent can now be restated as follows:

Burnside problem II. For which positive integers m, n is the free Burnside group B(m, n) finite?

The full solution to Burnside problem in this form is not known. Burnside considered some easy cases in his original paper:

- B(1, n) is the cyclic group of order n.
- B(m, 2) is the direct product of m copies of the cyclic group of order 2 and hence finite. (Note: The key step is to observe that the identities a^{2} = b^{2} = (ab)^{2} = 1 together imply that ab = ba, so that a free Burnside group of exponent two is necessarily abelian.)

The following additional results are known (Burnside, Sanov, M. Hall):

- B(m, 3), B(m, 4), and B(m, 6) are finite for all m.
Unsolved problem in mathematics
Is B(2, 5) finite?
More unsolved problems in mathematics

The particular case of B(2, 5) remains open.

The breakthrough in solving the Burnside problem was achieved by Pyotr Novikov and Sergei Adian in 1968. Using a complicated combinatorial argument, they demonstrated that for every odd number n with n > 4381, there exist infinite, finitely generated groups of exponent n. Adian later improved the bound on the odd exponent to 665. In 2015, Adian claimed to have obtained a lower bound of 101 for odd n; however, the full proof of this lower bound was never completed and never published. The case of even exponent turned out to be considerably more difficult. It was only in 1994 that Sergei Vasilievich Ivanov was able to prove an analogue of Novikov–Adian theorem: for any m > 1 and an even n ≥ 2^{48}, n divisible by 2^{9}, the group B(m, n) is infinite; together with the Novikov–Adian theorem, this implies infiniteness for all m > 1 and n ≥ 2^{48}. This was improved in 1996 by I. G. Lysënok to m > 1 and n ≥ 8000. Novikov–Adian, Ivanov and Lysënok established considerably more precise results on the structure of the free Burnside groups. In the case of the odd exponent, all finite subgroups of the free Burnside groups were shown to be cyclic groups. In the even exponent case, each finite subgroup is contained in a product of two dihedral groups, and there exist non-cyclic finite subgroups. Moreover, the word and conjugacy problems were shown to be effectively solvable in B(m, n) both for the cases of odd and even exponents n.

A famous class of counterexamples to the Burnside problem is formed by finitely generated non-cyclic infinite groups in which every nontrivial proper subgroup is a finite cyclic group, the so-called Tarski Monsters. First examples of such groups were constructed by A. Yu. Ol'shanskii in 1979 using geometric methods, thus affirmatively solving O. Yu. Schmidt's problem. In 1982 Ol'shanskii was able to strengthen his results to establish existence, for any sufficiently large prime number p (one can take p > 10^{75}) of a finitely generated infinite group in which every nontrivial proper subgroup is a cyclic group of order p. In a paper published in 1996, Ivanov and Ol'shanskii solved an analogue of the Burnside problem in an arbitrary hyperbolic group for sufficiently large exponents.

== Restricted Burnside problem ==
Formulated in the 1930s, it asks another, related, question:

Restricted Burnside problem. If it is known that a group G with m generators and exponent n is finite, can one conclude that the order of G is bounded by some constant depending only on m and n? Equivalently, are there only finitely many finite groups with m generators of exponent n, up to isomorphism?

This variant of the Burnside problem can also be stated in terms of category theory: an affirmative answer for all m is equivalent to saying that the category of finite groups of exponent n has all finite limits and colimits. It can also be stated more explicitly in terms of certain universal groups with m generators and exponent n. By basic results of group theory, the intersection of two normal subgroups of finite index in any group is itself a normal subgroup of finite index. Thus, the intersection M of all the normal subgroups of the free Burnside group B(m, n) which have finite index is a normal subgroup of B(m, n). One can therefore define the free restricted Burnside group B_{0}(m, n) to be the quotient group B(m, n)/M. Every finite group of exponent n with m generators is isomorphic to B(m,n)/N where N is a normal subgroup of B(m,n) with finite index. Therefore, by the Third Isomorphism Theorem, every finite group of exponent n with m generators is isomorphic to B_{0}(m,n)/(N/M) — in other words, it is a homomorphic image of B_{0}(m, n). The restricted Burnside problem then asks whether B_{0}(m, n) is a finite group. In terms of category theory, B_{0}(m, n) is the coproduct of n cyclic groups of order m in the category of finite groups of exponent n.

In the case of the prime exponent p, this problem was extensively studied by A. I. Kostrikin during the 1950s, prior to the negative solution of the general Burnside problem. His solution, establishing the finiteness of B_{0}(m, p), used a relation with deep questions about identities in Lie algebras in finite characteristic. The case of arbitrary exponent has been completely settled in the affirmative by Efim Zelmanov, who was awarded the Fields Medal in 1994 for his work.

== Bibliography ==
- S. I. Adian (1979) The Burnside problem and identities in groups. Translated from the Russian by John Lennox and James Wiegold. Ergebnisse der Mathematik und ihrer Grenzgebiete [Results in Mathematics and Related Areas], 95. Springer-Verlag, Berlin-New York. ISBN 3-540-08728-1.
- S. I. Adian (2015). "New estimates of odd exponents of infinite Burnside groups". Trudy Matematicheskogo Instituta imeni V. A. Steklova (in Russian). 289: 41–82. doi:10.1134/S0371968515020041. Translation in Adian, S. I. (2015). "New estimates of odd exponents of infinite Burnside groups". Proceedings of the Steklov Institute of Mathematics. 289 (1): 33–71. doi:10.1134/S0081543815040045.
- S. V. Ivanov (1994). "The Free Burnside Groups of Sufficiently Large Exponents". International Journal of Algebra and Computation. 04: 1–308. doi:10.1142/S0218196794000026.
- S. V. Ivanov; A. Yu. Ol'Shanskii (1996). "Hyperbolic groups and their quotients of bounded exponents". Transactions of the American Mathematical Society. 348 (6): 2091–2138. doi:10.1090/S0002-9947-96-01510-3.
- A. I. Kostrikin (1990) Around Burnside. Translated from the Russian and with a preface by James Wiegold. Ergebnisse der Mathematik und ihrer Grenzgebiete (3) [Results in Mathematics and Related Areas (3)], 20. Springer-Verlag, Berlin. ISBN 3-540-50602-0.
- I. G. Lysënok (1996). "Infinite Burnside groups of even exponent". Izvestiya Rossiiskoi Akademii Nauk. Seriya Matematicheskaya (in Russian). 60 (3): 3–224. doi:10.4213/im77. Translation in Lysënok, I. G. (1996). "Infinite Burnside groups of even exponent". Izvestiya: Mathematics. 60 (3): 453–654. Bibcode:1996IzMat..60..453L. doi:10.1070/IM1996v060n03ABEH000077. S2CID 250838960.
- A. Yu. Ol'shanskii (1989) Geometry of defining relations in groups. Translated from the 1989 Russian original by Yu. A. Bakhturin (1991) Mathematics and its Applications (Soviet Series), 70. Dordrecht: Kluwer Academic Publishers Group. ISBN 0-7923-1394-1.
- E. Zelmanov (1990). "Solution of the restricted Burnside problem for groups of odd exponent". Izvestiya Rossiiskoi Akademii Nauk. Seriya Matematicheskaya (in Russian). 54 (1): 42–59, 221. Translation in Zel'manov, E I (1991). "Solution of the Restricted Burnside Problem for Groups of Odd Exponent". Mathematics of the USSR-Izvestiya. 36 (1): 41–60. Bibcode:1991IzMat..36...41Z. doi:10.1070/IM1991v036n01ABEH001946. S2CID 39623037.
- E. Zelmanov (1991). "Solution of the restricted Burnside problem for 2-groups". Matematicheskii Sbornik (in Russian). 182 (4): 568–592. Translation in Zel'manov, E I (1992). "A Solution of the Restricted Burnside Problem for 2-groups". Mathematics of the USSR-Sbornik. 72 (2): 543–565. Bibcode:1992SbMat..72..543Z. doi:10.1070/SM1992v072n02ABEH001272.
