= Hopf conjectures =

Mathematical conjectures attributed to Heinz Hopf

In mathematics, Hopf conjecture may refer to one of several conjectural statements from differential geometry and topology attributed to Heinz Hopf.

== Positively or negatively curved Riemannian manifolds ==
The Hopf conjecture is an open problem in global Riemannian geometry. It goes back to questions by Heinz Hopf from 1931. A modern formulation is:

A compact, even-dimensional Riemannian manifold with positive sectional curvature has positive Euler characteristic. A compact, (2d)-dimensional Riemannian manifold with negative sectional curvature has Euler characteristic of sign $(-1)^d$.

For surfaces, these statements follow from the Gauss–Bonnet theorem. For four-dimensional manifolds, this follows from the finiteness of the fundamental group and Poincaré duality and Euler–Poincaré formula equating for 4-manifolds the Euler characteristic with $b_0-b_1+b_2-b_3+b_4$ and Synge's theorem, assuring that the orientation cover is simply connected, so that the odd Betti numbers vanish $b_1=b_3=0$. For 4-manifolds, the statement also follows from the Chern–Gauss–Bonnet theorem as noticed by John Milnor in 1955 (written down by Shiing-Shen Chern in 1955.). For manifolds of dimension 6 or higher the conjecture is open. An example of Robert Geroch had shown that the Chern–Gauss–Bonnet integrand can become negative for $d>2$. The positive curvature case is known to hold however for hypersurfaces in $\R^{2d+1}$ (Hopf) or codimension two surfaces embedded in $\R^{2d+2}$. For sufficiently pinched positive curvature manifolds, the Hopf conjecture (in the positive curvature case) follows from the sphere theorem, a theorem which had also been conjectured first by Hopf. One of the lines of attacks is by looking for manifolds with more symmetry. It is particular for example that all known manifolds of positive sectional curvature allow for an isometric circle action. The corresponding vector field is called a killing vector field. The conjecture (for the positive curvature case) has also been proved for manifolds of dimension $4k+2$ or $4k+4$ admitting an isometric torus action of a k-dimensional torus and for manifolds M admitting an isometric action of a compact Lie group G with principal isotropy subgroup H and cohomogeneity k such that $k-(\operatorname{rank} G-\operatorname{rank} H)\leq 5.$ Some references about manifolds with some symmetry are and

On the history of the problem: the first written explicit appearance of the conjecture is in the proceedings of the German Mathematical Society, which is a paper based on talks, Heinz Hopf gave in the spring of 1931 in Fribourg, Switzerland and at Bad Elster in the fall of 1931. Marcel Berger discusses the conjecture in his book, and points to the work of Hopf from the 1920s which was influenced by such type of questions. The conjectures are listed as problem 8 (positive curvature case) and 10 (negative curvature case) in "Yau's problems" of 1982.

== Non-negatively or non-positively curved Riemannian manifolds ==
There are analogue conjectures if the curvature is allowed to become zero too. The statement should still be attributed to Hopf (for example in a talk given in 1953 in Italy).

A compact, even-dimensional Riemannian manifold with non-negative sectional curvature has non-negative Euler characteristic. A compact, (2d)-dimensional Riemannian manifold with non-positive sectional curvature has Euler characteristic of sign $(-1)^d$ or zero.

This version was stated as such as Question 1 in the paper or then in a paper of Chern.

An example for which the conjecture is confirmed is for the product $M=M_1 \times M_2 \times \cdots \times M_d$ of 2-dimensional manifolds with curvature sign $e_k \in \{-1,0,1\}$. As the Euler characteristic satisfies $\chi(M) = \prod_{k=1}^d \chi(M_k)$ which has the sign $\prod_{k=1}^d e_k$, the sign conjecture is confirmed in that case (if $e_k>0$ for all k, then $\chi(M)>0$ and if $e_k<0$ for all k, then $\chi(M)>0$ for even d and $\chi(M)<0$ for odd d, and if one of the $e_k$ is zero, then $\chi(M)=0$).

== Self-maps of degree 1 ==
Hopf asked whether every continuous self-map of an oriented closed manifold of degree 1 is necessarily a homotopy equivalence.

It is easy to see that any map $f\colon M \to M$ of degree 1 induces a surjection on $\pi_1$; if not, then $f$ factors through a non-trivial covering space, contradicting the degree-1 assumption.

This implies that the conjecture holds for Hopfian groups, as for them one then gets that $f_*$ is an isomorphism on $\pi_1$.

An argument for higher homotopy groups remains open. Also there are non-Hopfian groups.

== Product conjecture for the product of two spheres ==
Another famous question of Hopf is the Hopf product conjecture:

Can the 4-manifold $\mathbb{S}^2 \times \mathbb{S}^2$ carry a metric with positive curvature?

The conjecture was popularized in the book of Gromoll, Klingenberg and Meyer from 1968, and was prominently displayed as Problem 1 in Yau's list of problems. Shing-Tung Yau formulated there an interesting new observation (which could be reformulated as a conjecture).

One does not know any example of a compact, simply-connected manifold of nonnegative sectional curvature which does not admit a metric of strictly positive curvature.

At present, the 4-sphere $\mathbb{S}^4$ and the complex projective plane $\mathbb{CP}^2$ are the only simply-connected 4-manifolds which are known to admit a metric of positive curvature. Wolfgang Ziller once conjectured this might be the full list and that in dimension 5, the only simply-connected 5-manifold of positive curvature is the 5-sphere $\mathbb{S}^5$. Of course, solving the Hopf product conjecture would settle the Yau question. Also the Ziller conjecture that $\mathbb{S}^4$ and $\mathbb{CP}^2$ are the only simply connected positive curvature 4-manifolds would settle the Hopf product conjecture. Back to the case $\mathbb{S}^2 \times \mathbb{S}^2$: it is known from work of Jean-Pierre Bourguignon that in the neighborhood of the product metric, there is no metric of positive curvature. It is also known from work of Alan Weinstein that if a metric is given on $\mathbb{S}^2 \times \mathbb{S}^2$ exists with positive curvature, then this Riemannian manifold can not be embedded in $\R^6$. (It follows already from a result of Hopf that an embedding in $\R^5$ is not possible as then the manifold has to be a sphere.) A general reference for manifolds with non-negative sectional curvature giving many examples is as well as. A related conjecture is that

A compact symmetric space of rank greater than one cannot carry a Riemannian metric of positive sectional curvature.

This would also imply that $\mathbb{S}^2 \times \mathbb{S}^2$ admits no Riemannian metric with positive sectional curvature. So, when looking at the evidence and the work done so far, it appears that the Hopf question most likely will be answered as the statement "There is no metric of positive curvature on $\mathbb{S}^2 \times \mathbb{S}^2$" because so far, the theorems of Bourguignon (perturbation result near product metric), Hopf (codimension 1), Weinstein (codimension 2) as well as the sphere theorem excluding pinched positive curvature metrics, point towards this outcome. The construction of a positive curvature metric on $\mathbb{S}^2 \times \mathbb{S}^2$ would certainly be a surprise in global differential geometry, but it is not excluded yet that such a metric exists.

Finally, one can ask why one would be interested in such a special case like the Hopf product conjecture. Hopf himself was motivated by problems from physics. When Hopf started to work in the mid 1920s, the theory of relativity was only 10 years old and it sparked a great deal of interest in differential geometry, especially in global structure of 4-manifolds, as such manifolds appear in cosmology as models of the universe.

== Thurston conjecture on aspherical manifolds (extension of Hopf's conjecture) ==
There is a conjecture which relates to the Hopf sign conjecture but which does not refer to Riemannian geometry at all. Aspherical manifolds are connected manifolds for which all higher homotopy groups disappear. The Euler characteristic then should satisfy the same condition as a negatively curved manifold is conjectured to satisfy in Riemannian geometry:

Suppose M^{2k} is a closed, aspherical manifold of even dimension. Then its Euler characteristic satisfies the inequality $(-1)^k\chi(M^{2k})\geq 0.$

There can not be a direct relation to the Riemannian case as there are aspherical manifolds that are not homeomorphic to a smooth Riemannian manifold with negative sectional curvature.

This topological version of Hopf conjecture is due to William Thurston. Ruth Charney and Michael Davis conjectured that the same inequality holds for a non-positively curved piecewise Euclidean (PE) manifold.

== (Unrelated:) Riemannian metrics with no conjugate points ==
There had been a bit of confusion about the word "Hopf conjecture" as an unrelated mathematician Eberhard Hopf and contemporary of Heinz Hopf worked on topics like geodesic flows. (Eberhard Hopf and Heinz Hopf are unrelated and might never have met even so they were both students of Erhard Schmidt). There is a theorem of Eberhard Hopf stating that if the 2-torus $\mathbb{T}^2$ has no conjugate points, then it must be flat (the Gauss curvature is zero everywhere). The theorem of Eberhard Hopf generalized a theorem of Marston Morse and Gustav Hedlund (a PhD student of Morse) from a year earlier. The problem to generalize this to higher dimensions was for some time known as the Hopf conjecture too. In any case, this is now a theorem: A Riemannian metric without conjugate points on the n-dimensional torus is flat.
