= Hyperbolization procedures =

Topology procedure in mathematics

A hyperbolization procedure is a procedure that turns a polyhedral complex $K$ into a non-positively curved space $\mathcal H (K)$, retaining some of its topological features. Roughly speaking, the procedure consists in replacing every cell of $K$ with a copy of a certain non-positively curved manifold with boundary, which is fixed a priori and is called the hyperbolizing cell of the procedure.

There are many different hyperbolization procedures available in the literature. While they all satisfy some common axioms, they differ by what kind of polyhedral complex is allowed as input and what kind of hyperbolizing cell is used. As a result, different procedures preserve different topological features and provide spaces with different geometric flavors. The first hyperbolization procedures were introduced by Mikhael Gromov in and later other versions were developed by several mathematicians including Ruth Charney, Michael W. Davis, and Pedro Ontaneda.

The word hyperbolization here does not have the same meaning that it has in the uniformization or hyperbolization results typical of low-dimensional geometry. The space $\mathcal H (K)$ is not homeomorphic to $K$. For instance, $\mathcal H (K)$ is always aspherical, regardless of whether $K$ is aspherical. Moreover, despite the name of the procedure, $\mathcal H (K)$ is not always guaranteed to be negatively curved, so some authors refer to these procedures as asphericalization procedures.

== Axioms ==
An assignment $K \to \mathcal H (K)$ is hyperbolization procedure if it satisfies the following properties:

1. (Non-positive curvature). $\mathcal H (K)$ admits a locally CAT(0) metric.
2. (Functoriality). If $L\hookrightarrow K$ is the inclusion of a subcomplex, then there is an isometric embedding $\mathcal H (L) \hookrightarrow \mathcal H (K)$ with locally convex image.
3. (Local structure is preserved). If $\sigma^n$ is an $n$-cell of $K$, then $\mathcal H (\sigma^n)$ is a connected $n$-manifold with boundary and the link of $\mathcal H (\sigma^n)$ in $\mathcal H (K)$ is isomorphic to the link of $\sigma^n$ in $K$, possibly up to subdivisions.
4. (Homology is enriched). The map $\mathcal H (K) \to K$ that sends $\mathcal H (\sigma^n)$ back to $\sigma^n$ induces a surjection on homology.

It follows in particular that if $K$ is a closed orientable $n$-manifold, then so is $\mathcal H (K)$.

== Examples ==
The following are some examples of common hyperbolization procedures.

=== Strict hyperbolization ===
In Charney and Davis introduced a hyperbolization procedure for which $\mathcal H (K)$ is locally CAT(-1). In particular, when $K$ is compact, the fundamental group $\pi_1(\mathcal H (K))$ is a Gromov hyperbolic group. The hyperbolizing cell in this procedure is a real hyperbolic manifold with boundary and corners constructed via arithmetic methods.

=== Riemannian hyperbolization ===
In Ontaneda showed that if K is a smooth triangulation of a smooth manifold, then the strict hyperbolization procedure of Charney-Davis can be refined to ensure that $\mathcal H (K)$ is a smooth manifold and that it admits a Riemannian metric of negative sectional curvature. Moreover, it is possible to pinch the curvature arbitrarily close to $-1$.

=== Relative hyperbolization ===
Any hyperbolization procedure $\mathcal H$ admits a relative version, which allows to work relatively to a subcomplex, i.e., keep it unaltered under the hyperbolization. More precisely, if $L\subseteq K$ is a subcomplex, then one can attach to $K$ the cone over $L$, apply the hyperbolization procedure to the coned-off complex, and the remove a small neighborhood of the cone point. Thanks to axiom (3) above, the link of the cone point is a copy of $L$, so removing a small neighborhood of the cone point results in a boundary component homeomorphic to $L$.

If $\mathcal H$ is the strict hyperbolization of Charney-Davis, then Belegradek showed that the relative version of $\mathcal H$ results in a space whose fundamental group is hyperbolic relative to $\pi_1(K)$.

== Applications ==
The following are some classical applications of hyperbolization procedures. The general recipe consists in constructing a complex or manifold with some desired topological features, and then applying a hyperbolization procedure to infuse it with non-positive or negative curvature. Depending on which procedure is used, one can get more geometric control on the output.

1. Every triangulable manifold is cobordant to a triangulable aspherical manifold. Namely, if $M$ is a triangulable manifold, let $\mathcal H(M)$ denote the hyperbolization of $M$ with respect to some triangulation. Then $M$ and $\mathcal H (M)$ are cobordant. The cobordism is obtained by applying $\mathcal H$ to the cone over $M$, and then removing a small open neighborhood of the cone point. Using strict hyperbolization, $\mathcal H (M)$ can be chosen to admit a topological metric of negative curvature. If $M$ is a smooth manifold, then $\mathcal H (M)$, the metric, and the cobordism can even be taken to be smooth.
2. For any $n \geq 5$ there are a closed $n$-manifold $N$ with a topological metric of negative curvature whose universal cover is not homeomorphic to $\mathbb R^n$, and also a closed $n$-manifold $N$ with a topological metric of negative curvature whose universal cover is homeomorphic to $\mathbb R^n$, but whose ideal boundary is not homeomorphic to the sphere $S^{n-1}$.
3. For any $n \geq 4$ and for any $\varepsilon > 0$ there exists a closed Riemannian $n$-manifold $N$ such that all the sectional curvatures of $N$ are in $[-1-\varepsilon, -1]$, but $N$ is not homeomorphic to a locally symmetric space. In particular, $\pi_1(N)$ is a Gromov hyperbolic group whose Gromov boundary is a sphere, but $\pi_1(N)$ is not isomorphic to a uniform lattice in a Lie group of rank 1.
4. If $M$ is a closed orientable PL-manifold that is the boundary of another PL-manifold, then there is a Gromov hyperbolic group $G$ whose Gromov boundary is the tree of manifolds defined by $M$, i.e., a certain inverse limit of connected sums of $M$.
