= Wu-Chung Hsiang =

Chinese-American mathematician

- 項武忠
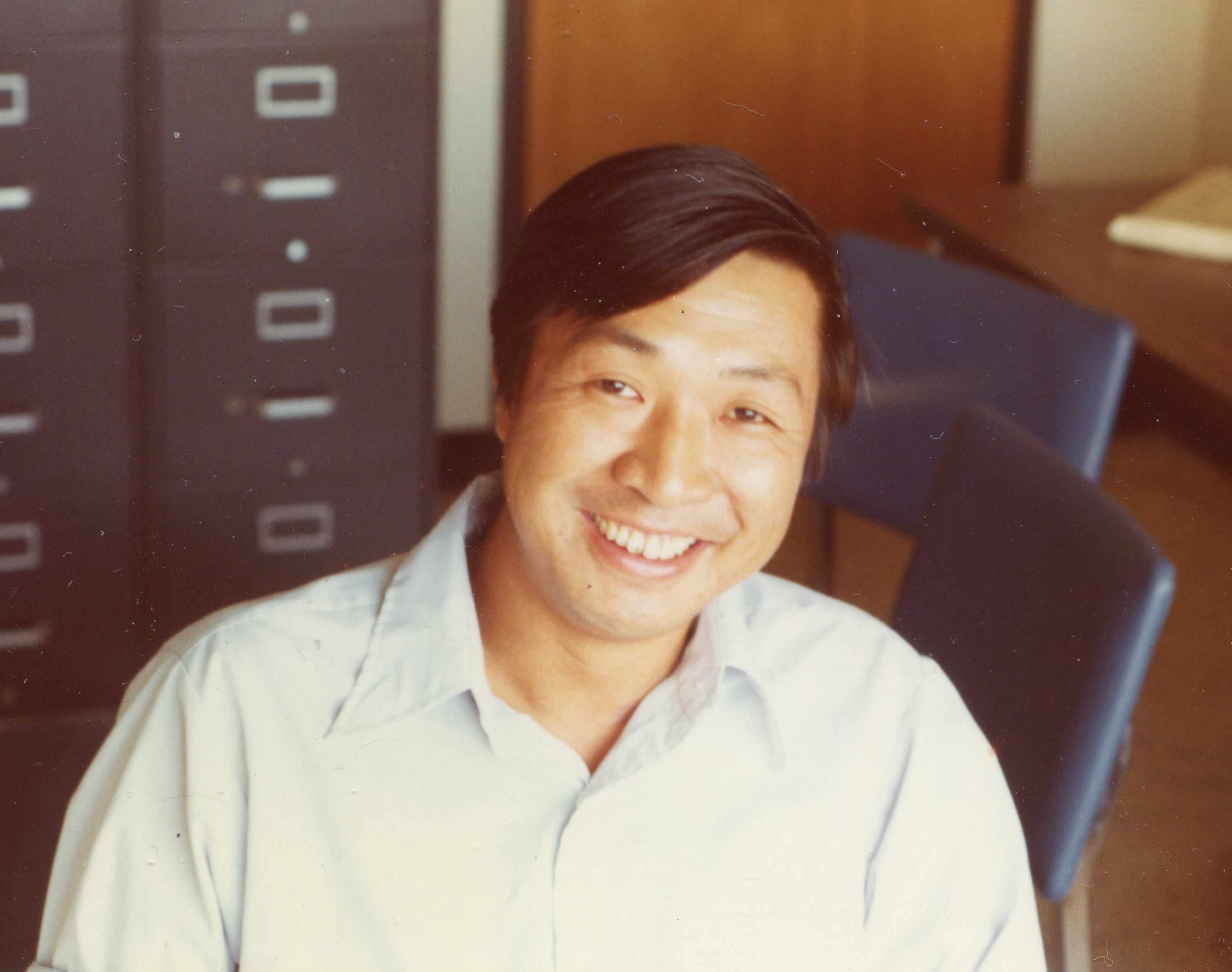
- Hsiang in 1975
- Born: 12 June 1935 (age 91); Anhui, China
- Education: National Taiwan University (BS); Princeton University (PhD)
- Spouse: Kuo Yu-pei (郭譽珮) (m. 1962)
- Scientific career
- Fields: Differential topology
- Workplaces: Yale University; Princeton University; Academia Sinica
- Thesis: Obstructions to sectioning fibre bundles (1962)
- Doctoral advisor: Norman Steenrod
- Doctoral students: Ruth Charney, F. Thomas Farrell, Kiyoshi Igusa; Thomas Goodwillie, Michael W. Davis, Lowell E. Jones

Chinese name
- Traditional Chinese: 項武忠
- Simplified Chinese: 项武忠
Transcriptions
Standard Mandarin
- Hanyu Pinyin: Xiàng Wǔzhōng
- Bopomofo: ㄒㄧㄤˋ ㄨˇ ㄓㄨㄥ
- Wade–Giles: Hsiang Wu-chung
Southern Min
- Hokkien POJ: Hāng Bú Tiong

Wu-Chung Hsiang (Chinese: 項武忠; born 12 June 1935) is a Taiwanese mathematician and topologist. He is known for his highly influential contributions to the field of differential topology as a professor at Yale University and then Princeton University, where he was the chairman of the mathematics department from 1982 to 1985. He has been described as one of the most influential topologists of the second half of the 20th century.

== Early life and education ==
Hsiang was born in 1935 in Anhui, China, to a family whose ancestral home was in Wenzhou, Zhejiang. He has two brothers: Hsiang Wu-i (項武義), a professor of mathematics at Brown University and UC Berkeley, and Hsiang Wu-teh, a professor at Syracuse University. Their father, a Kuomintang official under Chiang Kai-shek, was a professor at National Chengchi University. In 1949, the family moved to Taiwan during the Great Retreat.

Hsiang attended the Affiliated Senior High School of National Taiwan Normal University. He then studied physics as an undergraduate at National Taiwan University (NTU). In his junior year, he switched to mathematics and studied under mathematician Shih Kung-hsing (施拱星). He graduated from NTU in 1957 with a Bachelor of Science (B.S.) in mathematics and wrote his senior thesis on an algebraic topic.

After completing over a year of military service in the Republic of China Armed Forces, Hsiang worked as a research fellow at Academia Sinica. He then applied for graduate studies in the United States and was admitted to Princeton University and the University of Chicago, ultimately choosing to enroll at Princeton in September 1959 since he had also won a scholarship there. He earned his Ph.D. at Princeton under mathematician Norman Steenrod in 1963. His doctoral thesis was titled, "Obstructions to sectioning fibre bundles".

== Academic career ==
After receiving his doctorate from Princeton, Hsiang joined the faculty of mathematics at Yale University, where he became a lecturer in 1962, an assistant professor in 1963, then, in 1968, a full professor. At Princeton University he was a full professor from 1972 until retiring in 2006 as professor emeritus and was the department chair from 1982 to 1985. He was a visiting scholar at the Institute for Advanced Study for the academic years 1965–1966, 1971–1972, and 1979–1980. He was a visiting professor at the University of Warwick in 1966, the University of Amsterdam in 1969, the University of Bonn in 1971, the University of California, Berkeley, in 1976, and the Mathematical Sciences Research Institute and Stanford University in 1980.

Hsiang has made important contributions to algebraic and differential topology. Works by Hsiang, Julius Shaneson, C. T. C. Wall, Robion Kirby, Laurent Siebenmann and Andrew Casson led in the 1960s to the proof of the annulus theorem (previously known as the annulus conjecture). The annulus theorem is important in the theory of triangulation of manifolds.

With F. Thomas Farrell he worked on a program to prove the Novikov conjecture and the Borel conjecture with methods from geometric topology and gave proofs for special cases. For example, they gave a proof of the integral Novikov conjecture for compact Riemannian manifolds with non-positive sectional curvature. Hsiang also made contributions to the topological study of simply-connected 4-manifolds.

From 1967 to 1969 he was a Sloan Fellow and for the academic year 1975–1976 a Guggenheim Fellow. In 1980 he was elected a member of Academia Sinica. He was an Invited Speaker at the International Congress of Mathematicians in 1970 in Nice, with a talk on Differentiable actions of compact connected Lie groups on $R^n$ and a Plenary Speaker in 1983 in Warsaw, with a talk on Geometric applications of algebraic K-theory. In 1989, he was elected a member of the American Academy of Arts and Sciences. In 2005, there was a conference at Stanford University in honor of his 70th birthday.

His doctoral students include Ruth Charney, F. Thomas Farrell, Kiyoshi Igusa, Thomas Goodwillie, Michael W. Davis, and Lowell E. Jones.

== Selected publications ==
- Hsiang, W. C.; Shaneson, J. L. (March 1969). "Fake tori, the annulus conjecture, and the conjectures of kirby". Proceedings of the National Academy of Sciences of the United States of America. 62 (3): 687–691. Bibcode:1969PNAS...62..687H. doi:10.1073/pnas.62.3.687. ISSN 0027-8424. PMC 223652. PMID 16591738.
