= Poincaré–Hopf theorem =

Counts 0s of a vector field on a differentiable manifold using its Euler characteristic

In mathematics, the Poincaré–Hopf theorem (also known as the Poincaré–Hopf index formula, Poincaré–Hopf index theorem, or Hopf index theorem) is an important theorem in differential topology that relates zeros of continuous vector field on compact differentiable manifold to Euler characteristic of that manifold. It is named after Henri Poincaré who proved it for 2-dimensional case and Heinz Hopf who proved it in general.

Some authors include also additional assumptions like orientability of manifold or smoothness of vector field, but these assumptions are not required in general, and are usually taken to simplify proof or demonstration of theorem in specific context.

The Poincaré–Hopf theorem is often illustrated by the special case of the hairy ball theorem, which simply states that there is no continuous vector field on an even-dimensional n-sphere having no zeros.

== Formal statement ==
Let $M$ be a compact differentiable manifold, of dimension $n$, and $v$ a continuous vector field on $M$. If $M$ has a boundary, then we insist that $v$ be pointing in the outward normal direction along the boundary and have no zeros on the boundary.

Suppose that $x$ is an isolated zero of $v$, and fix some local coordinates near $x$. Pick a closed ball $D$ centered at $x$, so that $x$ is the only zero of $v$ in $D$. Then the index of $v$ at $x$, $\operatorname{index}_x(v)$, can be defined as the degree of the map $u : \partial D \to \mathbb S^{n-1}$ from the boundary of $D$ to the $(n-1)$-sphere given by $u(z)=v(z)/\|v(z)\|$.

Theorem. Let $M$ be a compact differentiable manifold and $v$ be a continuous vector field on $M$ that satisfies assumptions. Then we have the formula:

$$\sum_i \operatorname{index}_{x_i}(v) = \chi(M)\,$$

where the sum of the indices is over all the isolated zeroes of $v$ and $\chi(M)$ is the Euler characteristic of $M$.

The theorem was proven for two dimensions by Henri Poincaré and later generalized to higher dimensions by Heinz Hopf.

== Significance ==
The Euler characteristic of a closed surface is a purely topological concept, whereas the index of a vector field is purely analytic. Thus, this theorem establishes a deep link between two seemingly unrelated areas of mathematics. It is perhaps as interesting that the proof of this theorem relies heavily on integration, and, in particular, Stokes' theorem, which states that the integral of the exterior derivative of a differential form is equal to the integral of that form over the boundary. In the special case of a manifold without boundary, this amounts to saying that the integral is 0. But by examining vector fields in a sufficiently small neighborhood of a source or sink, we see that sources and sinks contribute integer amounts (known as the index) to the total, and they must all sum to 0. This result may be considered one of the earliest of a whole series of theorems (e.g. Atiyah–Singer index theorem, De Rham's theorem, Grothendieck–Riemann–Roch theorem) establishing deep relationships between geometric and analytical or physical concepts. They play an important role in the modern study of both fields.

== Sketch of proof ==
1. Embed M in some high-dimensional Euclidean space. (Use the Whitney embedding theorem.)
2. Take a small neighborhood of M in that Euclidean space, N_{ε}. Extend the vector field to this neighborhood so that it still has the same zeroes and the zeroes have the same indices. In addition, make sure that the extended vector field at the boundary of N_{ε} is directed outwards.
3. The sum of indices of the zeroes of the old (and new) vector field is equal to the degree of the Gauss map from the boundary of N_{ε} to the (n–1)-dimensional sphere. Thus, the sum of the indices is independent of the actual vector field, and depends only on the manifold M.
  Technique: cut away all zeroes of the vector field with small neighborhoods. Then use the fact that the degree of a map from the boundary of an n-dimensional manifold to an (n–1)-dimensional sphere, that can be extended to the whole n-dimensional manifold, is zero.
4. Finally, identify this sum of indices as the Euler characteristic of M. To do that, construct a very specific vector field on M using a triangulation of M for which it is clear that the sum of indices is equal to the Euler characteristic.

== Consequences ==
- A particularly useful corollary from the theorem is that when there is a non-vanishing continuous vector field on and compact differential manifold, the Euler characteristic of this manifold is 0.
- The hairy ball theorem theorem is an immediate consequence of the Poincare-Hopf theorem. Since an even-dimensional sphere has Euler characteristic 2, there cannot exist a non-vanishing vector field on such a sphere.
- The Poincaré–Hopf theorem shows that for a continuous vector field defined on plane, a closed trajectory cannot encircle arbitrary zeros of the vector field. A closed trajectory excises in this plane a manifold with boundary. The vector field restricted to that manifold goes along the boundary, so satisfies the assumptions of the theorem. Such manifold is homeomorphic to a closed ball, so have Euler characteristic 1. Therefore, the indices of all zeros inside a closed trajectory must sum up to 1.

A different closed trajectories in a continuous vector field (here for in case of a Hamiltonian system). Closed trajectory can encircle one centre or two centres and one saddle, but never just two centers or just the saddle.

== Generalizations ==
It is still possible to define the index for a vector field with nonisolated zeroes. A construction of this index and the extension of Poincaré–Hopf theorem for vector fields with nonisolated zeroes is outlined in Section 1.1.2 of (Brasselet, Seade & Suwa 2009).

Another generalization that uses only compact triangulable spaces and continuous mappings with finitely many fixed points is the Lefschetz-Hopf theorem. Since every vector field induces a flow on manifolds and fixed points of small flows correspond to zeroes of vector fields (and indices of zeroes equal indices of fixed points), the Poincare-Hopf theorem follows immediately from this.

== See also ==
- Eisenbud–Levine–Khimshiashvili signature formula
- Hopf theorem
