= F. Thomas Farrell =

American mathematician

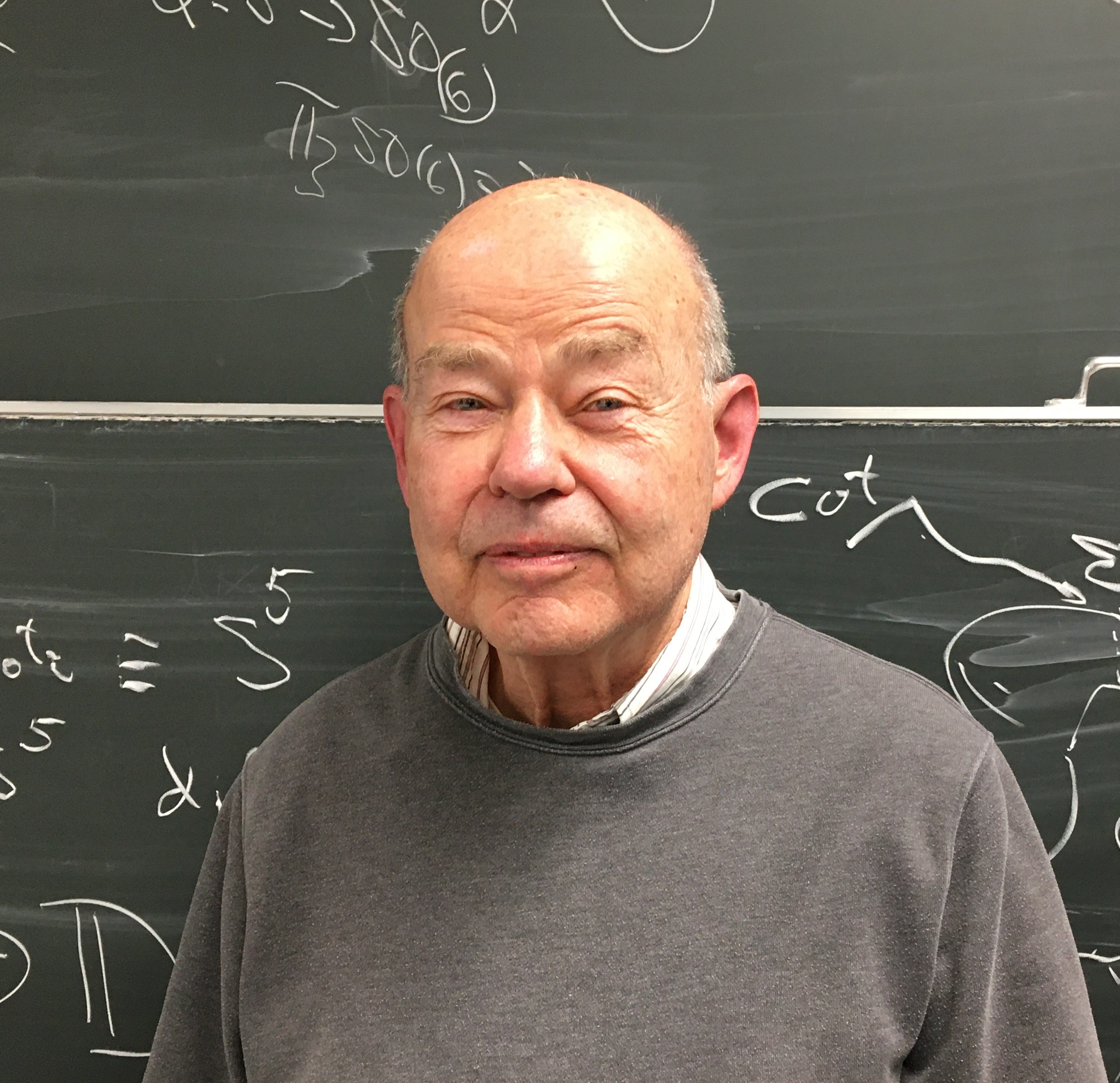
- F. Thomas Farrell in 2020
- Born: November 14, 1941 (age 84); Ohio, United States
- Education: University of Notre Dame (B.A., 1963); Yale University (Ph.D., 1967)
- Known for: Farrell-Jones Conjecture; Tate-Farrell cohomology
- Scientific career
- Fields: Topology; Differential geometry
- Workplaces: University of California at Berkeley; Pennsylvania State University; University of Michigan; Columbia University; Binghamton University; Tsinghua University
- Doctoral advisor: Wu-Chung Hsiang

Francis Thomas Farrell (born November 14, 1941) is an American mathematician who has made contributions in the area of topology and differential geometry. Farrell is a distinguished professor emeritus of mathematics at Binghamton University. He also holds a position at the Yau Mathematical Sciences Center, Tsinghua University.

== Biographical data ==
Farrell got his bachelor's degree in 1963 from the University of Notre Dame and earned his Ph.D in Mathematics from Yale University in 1967. His Ph.D. advisor was Wu-Chung Hsiang, and his doctoral thesis title was "The Obstruction to Fibering a Manifold over a Circle". He was a NSF Post-doctoral Fellow at the University of California at Berkeley from 1968 to 1969, and became an assistant professor there from 1969 to 1972. He then went to Pennsylvania State University, where he was promoted to professor in 1978. Later he joined the University of Michigan (1979–1985) and Columbia University (1984–1992). Since 1990 Farrell has been a faculty member at SUNY Binghamton.

In 1970, Farrell was invited to give a 50-minute address at the International Congress of Mathematicians about his thesis in Nice, France. In 1990, for their joint work on Rigidity in Geometry and Topology, his co-author Lowell E. Jones was invited to give a 45-minute address at the International Congress of Mathematicians in Kyoto, Japan.

== Mathematical contributions ==
Much of Farrell's work lies around the Borel conjecture. He and his co-authors have verified the conjecture for various cases, most notably flat manifolds, nonpositively curved manifolds.

In his thesis, Farrell solved the problem of determining when a manifold (of dimension greater than 5) can fiber over a circle.

In 1977, he introduced Tate–Farrell cohomology, which is a generalization to infinite groups of the Tate cohomology theory for finite groups.

In 1993, he and his co-author Lowell E. Jones introduced the Farrell–Jones conjecture and made contributions on it. The conjecture plays an important role in manifold topology.
