= Lowell E. Jones =

American mathematician

- Born: 1945 (age 80–81); United States
- Education: Yale University
- Known for: Farrell–Jones conjecture
- Scientific career
- Fields: Geometry, Topology
- Workplaces: Stony Brook University
- Doctoral advisor: Wu-Chung Hsiang
- Doctoral students: Pedro Ontaneda

Lowell Edwin Jones (born 1945) is an American professor of mathematics at Stony Brook University. Jones' primary fields of interest are topology and geometry. Jones is most well known for his collaboration with F. Thomas Farrell on the Farrell-Jones conjecture.

== Education and career ==
Jones received his Ph.D. from Yale University in 1970 under the guidance of Wu-Chung Hsiang. Jones' dissertation topic, assigned by Hsiang, concerned the fixed-point theorem of Paul Althaus Smith.

Jones joined Stony Brook University in 1975.

== Mathematical contributions ==
When Farrell and Jones first started collaborating they gave the very first example of an Anosov diffeomorphism on a manifold which was not infranil. Later, Jones and Farrell, also a student of Hsiang, caused a paradigm shift in higher dimensional topology when they applied ideas from differential geometry, and dynamics to questions such as the Borel conjecture. The Farrell-Jones conjecture implies the Borel Conjecture for manifolds of dimension greater than four.

Jones, and Farrell published about fifty papers during their 25-year collaboration.

Jones was invited to speak at the 1990 International Congress of Mathematicians in Kyoto.
