= Farrell–Jones conjecture =

Conjecture that states that certain assembly maps are isomorphisms

In mathematics, the Farrell–Jones conjecture, named after F. Thomas Farrell and Lowell E. Jones, states that certain assembly maps are isomorphisms. These maps are given as certain homomorphisms.

The motivation is the interest in the target of the assembly maps; this may be, for instance, the algebraic K-theory of a group ring

$$K_n(RG)$$

or the L-theory of a group ring

$$L_n(RG),$$

where G is some group.

The sources of the assembly maps are equivariant homology theory evaluated on the classifying space of G with respect to the family of virtually cyclic subgroups of G. So assuming the Farrell–Jones conjecture is true, it is possible to restrict computations to virtually cyclic subgroups to get information on complicated objects such as $K_n(RG)$ or $L_n(RG)$.

The Baum–Connes conjecture formulates a similar statement, for the topological K-theory of reduced group $C^*$-algebras $K^ {top}_n(C^r_*(G))$.

== Formulation ==
One can find for any ring $R$ equivariant homology theories $KR^?_*,LR^?_*$ satisfying

$KR_n^G(\{\cdot\})\cong K_n(R[G])$ respectively $LR_n^G(\{\cdot\})\cong L_n(R[G]).$

Here $R[G]$ denotes the group ring.

The K-theoretic Farrell–Jones conjecture for a group G states that the map $p:E_{VCYC}(G)\rightarrow \{\cdot\}$ induces an isomorphism on homology

$$KR_*^G(p):KR_*^G(E_{VCYC}(G))\rightarrow KR_*^G(\{\cdot\})\cong K_*(R[G]).$$

Here $E_{VCYC}(G)$ denotes the classifying space of the group G with respect to the family of virtually cyclic subgroups, i.e. a G-CW-complex whose isotropy groups are virtually cyclic and for any virtually cyclic subgroup of G the fixed point set is contractible.

The L-theoretic Farrell–Jones conjecture is analogous.

== Computational aspects ==
The computation of the algebraic K-groups and the L-groups of a group ring $R[G]$ is motivated by obstructions living in those groups (see for example Wall's finiteness obstruction, surgery obstruction, Whitehead torsion). So suppose a group $G$ satisfies the Farrell–Jones conjecture for algebraic K-theory. Suppose furthermore we have already found a model $X$ for the classifying space for virtually cyclic subgroups:

$$\emptyset=X^{-1}\subset X^0\subset X^1\subset \ldots \subset X$$

Choose $G$-pushouts and apply the Mayer-Vietoris sequence to them:

$KR_n^G(\coprod_{j\in I_i} G/H_j\times S^{i-1})\rightarrow KR_n^G(\coprod_{j\in I_i} G/H_j\times D^i)\oplus KR_n^G(X^{i-1})\rightarrow KR_n^G(X^i)$$\rightarrow KR_{n-1}^G(\coprod_{j\in I_i} G/H_j\times S^{i-1})\rightarrow KR_{n-1}^G(\coprod_{j\in I_i} G/H_j\times D^i)\oplus KR_{n-1}^G(X^{i-1})$

This sequence simplifies to:

$\bigoplus_{j\in I_i}K_n(R[H_j])\oplus \bigoplus_{j\in I_i} K_{n-1}(RH_j)\rightarrow \bigoplus_{j\in I_i} K_n(RH_j)\oplus KR_n^G(X^{i-1})\rightarrow KR_n^G(X^i)$$\rightarrow \bigoplus_{j\in I_i}K_{n-1}(RH_j)\oplus\bigoplus_{j\in I_i}K_{n-2}(RH_j)\rightarrow \bigoplus_{j\in I_i} K_{n-1}(RH_j)\oplus KR^G_{n-1}(X^{i-1})$

This means that if any group satisfies a certain isomorphism conjecture one can compute its algebraic K-theory (L-theory) only by knowing the algebraic K-Theory (L-Theory) of virtually cyclic groups and by knowing a suitable model for $E_{VCYC}(G)$.

=== Why the family of virtually cyclic subgroups? ===
One might also try to take for example the family of finite subgroups into account. This family is much easier to handle. Consider the infinite cyclic group $\Z$. A model for $E_{FIN}(\Z)$ is given by the real line $\R$, on which $\Z$ acts freely by translations. Using the properties of equivariant K-theory we get

$$K_n^\Z(\R)=K_n(S^1)=K_n(pt)\oplus K_{n-1}(pt)=K_n(R)\oplus K_{n-1}(R).$$

The Bass-Heller-Swan decomposition gives

$$K_n^\Z(pt)=K_n(R[\Z])\cong K_n(R)\oplus K_{n-1}(R)\oplus NK_n(R)\oplus NK_n(R).$$

Indeed one checks that the assembly map is given by the canonical inclusion.

$$K_n(R)\oplus K_{n-1}(R)\hookrightarrow K_n(R)\oplus K_{n-1}(R)\oplus NK_n(R)\oplus NK_n(R)$$

So it is an isomorphism if and only if $NK_n(R) =0$, which is the case if $R$ is a regular ring. So in this case one can really use the family of finite subgroups. On the other hand this shows that the isomorphism conjecture for algebraic K-Theory and the family of finite subgroups is not true. One has to extend the conjecture to a larger family of subgroups which contains all the counterexamples. Currently no counterexamples for the Farrell–Jones conjecture are known. If there is a counterexample, one has to enlarge the family of subgroups to a larger family which contains that counterexample.

== Inheritances of isomorphism conjectures ==
The class of groups which satisfies the fibered Farrell–Jones conjecture contain the following groups

- virtually cyclic groups (definition)
- hyperbolic groups (see)
- CAT(0) groups (see)
- solvable groups (see)
- mapping class groups (see)

Furthermore the class has the following inheritance properties:

- Closed under finite products of groups.
- Closed under taking subgroups.

== Meta-conjecture and fibered isomorphism conjectures ==
Fix an equivariant homology theory $H^?_*$. One could say, that a group G satisfies the isomorphism conjecture for a family of subgroups$F$, if and only if the map induced by the projection $E_F(G)\rightarrow \{\cdot\}$ induces an isomorphism on homology:

$$H_*^G(E_F(G))\rightarrow H_*^G(\{\cdot\})$$

The group G satisfies the fibered isomorphism conjecture for the family of subgroups F if and only if for any group homomorphism $\alpha :H\rightarrow G$ the group H satisfies the isomorphism conjecture for the family

$$\alpha^*F:=\{H'\le H|\alpha(H)\in F\}$$.

One gets immediately that in this situation $H$ also satisfies the fibered isomorphism conjecture for the family $\alpha^*F$.

=== Transitivity principle ===
The transitivity principle is a tool to change the family of subgroups to consider. Given two families $F\subset F'$ of subgroups of $G$. Suppose every group $H\in F'$ satisfies the (fibered) isomorphism conjecture with respect to the family $F|_H:=\{H'\in F|H'\subset H\}$. Then the group $G$ satisfies the fibered isomorphism conjecture with respect to the family $F$ if and only if it satisfies the (fibered) isomorphism conjecture with respect to the family $F'$.

=== Isomorphism conjectures and group homomorphisms ===
Given any group homomorphism $\alpha\colon H\rightarrow G$ and suppose that G"' satisfies the fibered isomorphism conjecture for a family F of subgroups. Then also H"' satisfies the fibered isomorphism conjecture for the family $\alpha^*F$. For example if $\alpha$ has finite kernel the family $\alpha^*VCYC$ agrees with the family of virtually cyclic subgroups of H.

For suitable $\alpha$ one can use the transitivity principle to reduce the family again.

== Connections to other conjectures ==
=== Novikov conjecture ===
There are also connections from the Farrell–Jones conjecture to the Novikov conjecture. It is known that if one of the following maps

$$H^G_*(E_{VCYC}(G),L^{\langle-\infty\rangle}_R)\rightarrow H^G_*(\{\cdot\},L^{\langle-\infty\rangle}_R)= L^{\langle-\infty\rangle}_*(RG)$$

$$H^G_*(E_{FIN}(G),K^{top}) \rightarrow H^G_*(\{\cdot\},K^{top}) = K_n(C^*_r(G))$$

is rationally injective, then the Novikov-conjecture holds for $G$. See for example,.

=== Bost conjecture ===
The Bost conjecture (named for Jean-Benoît Bost) states that the assembly map

$$H^G_*(E_{FIN}(G),K^{top}_{l^1})\rightarrow H^G_*(\{\cdot\},K^{top}_{l^1})=K_*(l^1(G))$$

is an isomorphism. The ring homomorphism $l^1(G)\rightarrow C_r(G)$ induces maps in K-theory $K_*(l^1(G))\rightarrow K_*(C_r(G))$. Composing the upper assembly map with this homomorphism one gets exactly the assembly map occurring in the Baum–Connes conjecture.

$$H^G_*(E_{FIN}(G),K^{top}_{l^1})=H^G_*(E_{FIN}(G),K^{top})\rightarrow H^G_*(\{\cdot\},K^{top})=K_*(C_r(G))$$

=== Kaplansky conjecture ===
The Kaplansky conjecture predicts that for an integral domain $R$ and a torsion-free group $G$ the only idempotents in $R[G]$ are $0,1$. Each such idempotent $p$ gives a projective $R[G]$ module by taking the image of the right multiplication with $p$. Hence there seems to be a connection between the Kaplansky conjecture and the vanishing of $K_0(R[G])$. There are theorems relating the Kaplansky conjecture to the Farrell–Jones conjecture (compare).
