= Pedro Ontaneda =

American mathematician

- Education: Stony Brook University (Ph.D., 1994)
- Known for: Riemannian hyperbolization
- Scientific career
- Fields: Topology; Differential geometry
- Workplaces: Binghamton University; Federal University of Pernambuco
- Doctoral advisor: Lowell Jones

Pedro Ontaneda Portal is a Peruvian-American mathematician specializing in topology and differential geometry. He is a distinguished professor at Binghamton University, a unit of the State University of New York.

== Education and career ==
Ontaneda received his Ph.D. in 1994 from Stony Brook University (another unit of SUNY), advised by Lowell Jones. Subsequently he taught at the Federal University of Pernambuco in Brazil. He moved to Binghamton University in 2005.

== Mathematical contributions ==
Ontaneda's work deals with the geometry and topology of aspherical spaces, with particular attention to the relationship between exotic structures and negative or non-positive curvature on manifolds.

Classical examples of Riemannian manifolds of negative curvature are given by real hyperbolic manifolds, or more generally by locally symmetric spaces of rank 1. One of Ontaneda's most celebrated contributions is the construction of manifolds that admit negatively curved Riemannian metrics but do not admit locally symmetric ones. More precisely, he showed that for any $n \geq 4$ and for any $\varepsilon > 0$ there exists a closed Riemannian $n$-manifold $N$ satisfying the following two properties:

1. All the sectional curvatures of $N$ are in $[-1-\varepsilon, -1]$.
2. $N$ is not homeomorphic to a locally symmetric space.

In particular, the fundamental group of $N$ is Gromov hyperbolic but not isomorphic to a uniform lattice in a Lie group of rank 1.

These manifolds are obtained via the Riemannian hyperbolization procedure developed by Ontaneda in a series of papers, which is a smooth version of the strict hyperbolization procedure introduced by Ruth Charney and Michael W. Davis. The obstruction to being locally symmetric comes from the fact that Ontaneda's manifolds have nontrivial rational Pontryagin classes. The restriction to dimension $n \geq 4$ is necessary. Indeed, if a surface admits a negatively curved metric, then it admits one that is locally isometric to the real hyperbolic plane, as a consequence of the uniformization theorem. A similar statement holds for $3$-manifolds thanks to the hyperbolization theorem.

Ontaneda also made a "remarkable" contribution to the classification of dynamical systems by constructing partially hyperbolic diffeomorphisms (a generalization of Anosov diffeomorphisms) on some simply connected manifolds of high dimension; see his 2015 paper.

== Selected publications ==
- F. T. Farrell, L. E. Jones, and P. Ontaneda (2007), "Negative curvature and exotic topology." In Surveys in Differential Geometry, Vol. XI, pp. 329–347, International Press, Somerville, MA.
- F. T. Farrell, P. Ontaneda (2010), "On the topology of the space of negatively curved metrics." Journal of Differential Geometry 86, no. 2, pp. 273–301.
- A. Gogolev, P. Ontaneda, and Federico Rodriguez Hertz (2015), "New partially hyperbolic dynamical systems I." Acta Mathematica 215, no. 2, pp. 363–393.
- P. Ontaneda (2020), "Riemannian hyperbolization." Publ. Math. Inst. Hautes Études Sci. 131, pp. 1–72.
