= Co-Hopfian group =

In the mathematical subject of group theory, a co-Hopfian group is a group that is not isomorphic to any of its proper subgroups. The notion is dual to that of a Hopfian group, named after Heinz Hopf.

== Formal definition ==
A group G is called co-Hopfian if whenever $\varphi:G\to G$ is an injective group homomorphism then $\varphi$ is surjective, that is $\varphi(G)=G$.

== Examples and non-examples ==
- Every finite group G is co-Hopfian.
- The infinite cyclic group $\mathbb Z$ is not co-Hopfian since $f:\mathbb Z\to \mathbb Z, f(n)=2n$ is an injective but non-surjective homomorphism.
- The additive group of real numbers $\mathbb R$ is not co-Hopfian, since $\mathbb R$ is an infinite-dimensional vector space over $\mathbb Q$ and therefore, as a group $\mathbb R\cong \mathbb R\times \mathbb R$.
- The additive group of rational numbers $\mathbb Q$ and the quotient group $\mathbb Q/\mathbb Z$ are co-Hopfian.
- The multiplicative group $\mathbb Q^\ast$ of nonzero rational numbers is not co-Hopfian, since the map $\mathbb Q^\ast\to\mathbb Q^\ast, q\mapsto \operatorname{sign}(q)\,q^2$ is an injective but non-surjective homomorphism. In the same way, the group $\mathbb Q^{\ast}_+$ of positive rational numbers is not co-Hopfian.
- The multiplicative group $\mathbb C^\ast$ of nonzero complex numbers is not co-Hopfian.
- For every $n\ge 1$ the free abelian group $\mathbb Z^n$ is not co-Hopfian.
- For every $n\ge 1$ the free group $F_n$ is not co-Hopfian.
- There exists a finitely generated non-elementary (that is, not virtually cyclic) virtually free group which is co-Hopfian. Thus a subgroup of finite index in a finitely generated co-Hopfian group need not be co-Hopfian, and being co-Hopfian is not a quasi-isometry invariant for finitely generated groups.
- Baumslag–Solitar groups $BS(1,m)$, where $m\ge 1$, are not co-Hopfian.
- If G is the fundamental group of a closed aspherical manifold with nonzero Euler characteristic (or with nonzero simplicial volume or nonzero L^{2}-Betti number), then G is co-Hopfian.
- If G is the fundamental group of a closed connected oriented irreducible 3-manifold M then G is co-Hopfian if and only if no finite cover of M is a torus bundle over the circle or the product of a circle and a closed surface.
- If G is an irreducible lattice in a real semi-simple Lie group and G is not a virtually free group then G is co-Hopfian. E.g. this fact applies to the group $SL(n,\mathbb Z)$ for $n\ge 3$.
- If G is a one-ended torsion-free word-hyperbolic group then G is co-Hopfian, by a result of Sela.
- If G is the fundamental group of a complete finite volume smooth Riemannian n-manifold (where n > 2) of pinched negative curvature then G is co-Hopfian.
- The mapping class group of a closed hyperbolic surface is co-Hopfian.
- The group Out(F_{n}) (where n>2) is co-Hopfian.
- Delzant and Polyagailo gave a characterization of co-Hopficity for geometrically finite Kleinian groups of isometries of $\mathbb H^n$ without 2-torsion.
- A right-angled Artin group $A(\Gamma)$ (where $\Gamma$ is a finite nonempty graph) is not co-Hopfian; sending every standard generator of $A(\Gamma)$ to a power $>1$ defines and endomorphism of $A(\Gamma)$ which is injective but not surjective.
- A finitely generated torsion-free nilpotent group G may be either co-Hopfian or not co-Hopfian, depending on the properties of its associated rational Lie algebra.
- If G is a relatively hyperbolic group and $\varphi:G\to G$ is an injective but non-surjective endomorphism of G then either $\varphi^k(G)$ is parabolic for some k >1 or G splits over a virtually cyclic or a parabolic subgroup.
- Grigorchuk group G of intermediate growth is not co-Hopfian.
- Thompson group F is not co-Hopfian.
- There exists a finitely generated group G which is not co-Hopfian but has Kazhdan's property (T).
- If G is Higman's universal finitely presented group then G is not co-Hopfian, and G cannot be embedded in a finitely generated recursively presented co-Hopfian group.

== Generalizations and related notions ==
- A group G is called finitely co-Hopfian if whenever $\varphi:G\to G$ is an injective endomorphism whose image has finite index in G then $\varphi(G)=G$. For example, for $n\ge 2$ the free group $F_n$ is not co-Hopfian but it is finitely co-Hopfian.
- A finitely generated group G is called scale-invariant if there exists a nested sequence of subgroups of finite index of G, each isomorphic to G, and whose intersection is a finite group.
- A group G is called dis-cohopfian if there exists an injective endomorphism $\varphi:G\to G$ such that $\bigcap_{n=1}^\infty \varphi^n(G)=\{1\}$.
- In coarse geometry, a metric space X is called quasi-isometrically co-Hopf if every quasi-isometric embedding $f:X\to X$ is coarsely surjective (that is, is a quasi-isometry). Similarly, X is called coarsely co-Hopf if every coarse embedding $f:X\to X$ is coarsely surjective.
- In metric geometry, a metric space K is called quasisymmetrically co-Hopf if every quasisymmetric embedding $K\to K$ is onto.

== See also ==
- Hopfian object
