= Doi-Hopf module =

Concept in Hopf algebra and weak Hopf algebra

In quantum group, Hopf algebra and weak Hopf algebra, the Doi-Hopf module is a crucial construction that has many applications. It's named after Japanese mathematician Yukio Doi (土井 幸雄) and German mathematician Heinz Hopf. The concept was introduce by Doi in his 1992 paper "unifying Hopf modules".

== Doi-Hopf module ==
A right Doi-Hopf datum is a triple $(H,A,C)$ with $H$ a Hopf algebra, $A$ a left $H$-comodule algebra, and $C$ a right $H$-module coalgebra. A left-right Doi-Hopf $(H,A,C)$-module $M$ is a left $A$-module and a right $C$-comodule via $\beta: M\to M\otimes C$ such that $\beta(am)=\sum a_{(0)}m_{[0]}\otimes a_{(1)}\rightharpoonup m_{[1]}$ for all $a\in A,m\in M$. The subscript is the Sweedler notation.

A left Doi-Hopf datum is a triple $(H,A,C)$ with $H$ a Hopf algebra, $A$ a right $H$-comodule algebra, and $C$ a left $H$-module coalgebra. A Doi-Hopf module can be defined similarly.

== Doi-Hopf module in weak Hopf algebra ==
The generalization of Doi-Hopf module in weak Hopf algebra case is given by Gabriella Böhm in 2000.
