= Eisenbud–Levine–Khimshiashvili signature formula =

Computes the Poincaré–Hopf index of a real, analytic vector field at a singularity

In mathematics, and especially differential topology and singularity theory, the Eisenbud–Levine–Khimshiashvili signature formula gives a way of computing the Poincaré–Hopf index of a real, analytic vector field at an algebraically isolated singularity. It is named after David Eisenbud, Harold I. Levine, and George Khimshiashvili. Intuitively, the index of a vector field near a zero is the number of times the vector field wraps around the sphere. Because analytic vector fields have a rich algebraic structure, the techniques of commutative algebra can be brought to bear to compute their index. The signature formula expresses the index of an analytic vector field in terms of the signature of a certain quadratic form.

== Nomenclature ==
Consider the n-dimensional space R^{n}. Assume that R^{n} has some fixed coordinate system, and write x for a point in R^{n}, where x = (x_{1}, …, x_{n}).

Let X be a vector field on R^{n}. For 1 ≤ k ≤ n there exist functions ƒ_{k} : R^{n} → R such that one may express X as

$$X = f_1({\mathbf x})\,\frac{\partial}{\partial x_1} + \cdots + f_n({\mathbf x})\,\frac{\partial}{\partial x_n} .$$

To say that X is an analytic vector field means that each of the functions ƒ_{k} : R^{n} → R is an analytic function. One says that X is singular at a point p in R^{n} (or that p is a singular point of X) if X(p) = 0, i.e. X vanishes at p. In terms of the functions ƒ_{k} : R^{n} → R it means that ƒ_{k}(p) = 0 for all 1 ≤ k ≤ n. A singular point p of X is called isolated (or that p is an isolated singularity of X) if X(p) = 0 and there exists an open neighbourhood U ⊆ R^{n}, containing p, such that X(q) ≠ 0 for all q in U, different from p. An isolated singularity of X is called algebraically isolated if, when considered over the complex domain, it remains isolated.

Since the Poincaré–Hopf index at a point is a purely local invariant (cf. Poincaré–Hopf theorem), one may restrict one's study to that of germs. Assume that each of the ƒ_{k} from above are function germs, i.e. ƒ_{k} : (R^{n},0) → (R,0). In turn, one may call X a vector field germ.

== Construction ==
Let A_{n,0} denote the ring of analytic function germs (R^{n},0) → (R,0). Assume that X is a vector field germ of the form

$$X = f_1({\mathbf x})\,\frac{\partial}{\partial x_1} + \cdots + f_n({\mathbf x})\,\frac{\partial}{\partial x_n}$$

with an algebraically isolated singularity at 0. Where, as mentioned above, each of the ƒ_{k} are function germs (R^{n},0) → (R,0). Denote by I_{X} the ideal generated by the ƒ_{k}, i.e. I_{X} = (ƒ_{1}, …, ƒ_{n}). Then one considers the local algebra, B_{X}, given by the quotient

$$B_X := A_{n,0} / I_X \, .$$

The Eisenbud–Levine–Khimshiashvili signature formula states that the index of the vector field X at 0 is given by the signature of a certain non-degenerate bilinear form (to be defined below) on the local algebra B_{X}.

The dimension of $B_X$ is finite if and only if the complexification of X has an isolated singularity at 0 in C^{n}; i.e. X has an algebraically isolated singularity at 0 in R^{n}. In this case, B_{X} will be a finite-dimensional, real algebra.

=== Definition of the bilinear form ===
Using the analytic components of X, one defines another analytic germ F : (R^{n},0) → (R^{n},0) given by

$$F({\mathbf x}) := (f_1({\mathbf x}), \ldots, f_n({\mathbf x})) ,$$

for all x ∈ R^{n}. Let J_{F} ∈ A_{n,0} denote the determinant of the Jacobian matrix of F with respect to the basis {∂/∂x_{1}, …, ∂/∂x_{n}}. Finally, let [J_{F}] ∈ B_{X} denote the equivalence class of J_{F}, modulo I_{X}. Using ∗ to denote multiplication in B_{X} one is able to define a non-degenerate bilinear form β as follows:

$$\beta : B_X \times B_X \stackrel{*}{\longrightarrow} B_X \stackrel{\ell}{\longrightarrow} \R; \ \ \beta(g,h) = \ell(g*h) ,$$

where $\scriptstyle \ell$ is any linear function such that

$$\ell \left( \left[ J_F \right] \right) > 0 .$$

As mentioned: the signature of β is exactly the index of X at 0.

== Example ==
Consider the case n = 2 of a vector field on the plane. Consider the case where X is given by

$$X := (x^3 - 3xy^2) \, \frac{\partial}{\partial x} + (3x^2y - y^3) \, \frac{\partial}{\partial y} .$$

Clearly X has an algebraically isolated singularity at 0 since X = 0 if and only if x = y = 0. The ideal I_{X} is given by (x^{3} − 3xy^{2}, 3x^{2}y − y^{3}), and

$$B_X = A_{2,0} / (x^3 - 3xy^2, 3x^2y - y^3) \cong \R\langle 1, x, y, x^2, xy, y^2, xy^2, y^3, y^4 \rangle .$$

The first step for finding the non-degenerate, bilinear form β is to calculate the multiplication table of B_{X}; reducing each entry modulo I_{X}. Whence

∗	1	x	y	x^{2}	xy	y^{2}	xy^{2}	y^{3}	y^{4}
1	1	x	y	x^{2}	xy	y^{2}	xy^{2}	y^{3}	y^{4}
x	x	x^{2}	xy	3xy^{3}	y^{3}/3	xy^{2}	y^{4}/3	0	0
y	y	xy	y^{2}	y^{3}/3	xy^{2}	y^{3}	0	y^{4}	0
x^{2}	x^{2}	3xy^{2}	y^{3}/3	y^{4}	0	y^{4}/3	0	0	0
xy	xy	y^{3}/3	xy^{2}	0	y^{4}/3	0	0	0	0
y^{2}	y^{2}	xy^{2}	y^{3}	y^{4}/3	0	y^{4}	0	0	0
xy^{2}	xy^{2}	y^{4}/3	0	0	0	0	0	0	0
y^{3}	y^{3}	0	y^{4}	0	0	0	0	0	0
y^{4}	y^{4}	0	0	0	0	0	0	0	0

Direct calculation shows that J_{F} = 9(x^{4} + 2x^{2}y^{2} + y^{4}), and so [J_{F}] = 24y^{4}. Next one assigns values for $\scriptstyle \ell$. One may take

$$\ell(1) = \ell(x) = \ell(y) = \ell(x^2) = \ell(xy) = \ell(y^2) = \ell(xy^2) = \ell(y^3) = 0, \ \text{and} \  \ell(y^4) = 3 .$$

This choice was made so that $\scriptstyle \ell\left( \left[ J_F \right] \right) \, > \, 0$ as was required by the hypothesis, and to make the calculations involve integers, as opposed to fractions. Applying this to the multiplication table gives the matrix representation of the bilinear form β with respect to the given basis: $\left[ \begin{array}{ccccccccc} 0 & 0 & 0 & 0 & 0 & 0 & 0 & 0 & 3 \\ 0 & 0 & 0 & 0 & 0 & 0 & 1 & 0 & 0 \\ 0 & 0 & 0 & 0 & 0 & 0 & 0 & 3 & 0 \\ 0 & 0 & 0 & 3 & 0 & 1 & 0 & 0 & 0 \\ 0 & 0 & 0 & 0 & 1 & 0 & 0 & 0 & 0 \\ 0 & 0 & 0 & 1 & 0 & 3 & 0 & 0 & 0 \\ 0 & 1 & 0 & 0 & 0 & 0 & 0 & 0 & 0 \\ 0 & 0 & 3 & 0 & 0 & 0 & 0 & 0 & 0 \\ 3 & 0 & 0 & 0 & 0 & 0 & 0 & 0 & 0 \\ \end{array} \right]$ The eigenvalues of this matrix are −3, −3, −1, 1, 1, 2, 3, 3 and 4 There are 3 negative eigenvalues (#N = 3), and six positive eigenvalues (#P = 6); meaning that the signature of β is #P − #N = 6 − 3 = +3. It follows that X has Poincaré–Hopf index +3 at the origin.

== Topological verification ==
With this particular choice of X it is possible to verify the Poincaré–Hopf index is +3 by a direct application of the definition of Poincaré–Hopf index. This is very rarely the case, and was the reason for the choice of example. If one takes polar coordinates on the plane, i.e. x = r cos(θ) and y = r sin(θ) then x^{3} − 3xy^{2} = r^{3}cos(3θ) and 3x^{2}y − y^{3} = r^{3}sin(3θ). Restrict X to a circle, centre 0, radius 0 < ε ≪ 1, denoted by C_{0,ε}; and consider the map G : C_{0,ε} → C_{0,1} given by

$$G\colon  X \longmapsto \frac{X}{||X||} .$$

The Poincaré–Hopf index of X is, by definition, the topological degree of the map G. Restricting X to the circle C_{0,ε}, for arbitrarily small ε, gives

$$G(\theta) = (\cos(3\theta),\sin(3\theta)) , \,$$

meaning that as θ makes one rotation about the circle C_{0,ε} in an anti-clockwise direction; the image G(θ) makes three complete, anti-clockwise rotations about the unit circle C_{0,1}. Meaning that the topological degree of G is +3 and that the Poincaré–Hopf index of X at 0 is +3.
