= Constantin Gonciulea =

American computer scientist and technology executive

- Born: Drobeta-Turnu Severin, Romania
- Citizenship: United States
- Education: University of Bucharest; The Ohio State University (M.S. in Computer Science, Ph.D. in Mathematics)
- Occupations: Computer scientist; Technology executive
- Years active: 2000–present
- Employer: Wells Fargo
- Known for: Quantum computing research for financial services
- Notable work: Building Quantum Software with Python: A Developer’s Guide (2025)
- Scientific career
- Fields: Quantum Computing; Financial Engineering
- Thesis: Virtual epimorphisms of Coxeter groups onto free groups (2000)
- Doctoral advisor: Michael W. Davis

Constantin Gonciulea is an American computer scientist and technology executive recognized for his work in advanced computing, quantum technologies, and financial systems. He serves as the Chief Technology Officer for Advanced Technology at Wells Fargo and co-authored Building Quantum Software with Python.

== Early life and education ==
Gonciulea was born in Drobeta-Turnu Severin, Romania. He studied at the University of Bucharest and earned a Bachelor of Science degree in 1992. According to a 2015 regional mathematical society magazine, Gonciulea was awarded in several Romanian mathematics competitions in his youth, including the Junior Mathematics Olympiad (OJM), the National Mathematics Olympiad (ONM), the Gheorghe Țițeica Contest, the GMB Solvers competition, and National Scientific Communications Sessions. He later moved to the United States to continue his studies at The Ohio State University, where he received a Master of Science in 1999 and a Ph.D. in Mathematics in 2000. His doctoral dissertation, titled Virtual epimorphisms of Coxeter groups onto free groups, focused on algebra, geometry, and group theory.

== Career ==
After finishing his academic studies, Gonciulea entered the technology sector, specializing in applied computer science and technology leadership. He has worked in the financial services industry on enterprise software and digital banking systems for server-side, web, and mobile platforms. His career includes software engineering, technology architecture, and strategy in areas such as payment systems, digital platforms, distributed computing, and financial technology.

At JPMorgan Chase, Gonciulea looked into the potential use of quantum computing in financial services. His work at the bank involved studying quantum algorithms for various applications, risk analysis, portfolio optimization, and cryptography.

In June 2021, Gonciulea joined Wells Fargo to lead the bank’s Advanced Technology organization. As Chief Technology Officer for Advanced Technology, he manages research and development in quantum computing, distributed systems, and other emerging technologies. He has participated in industry conferences and technology events, such as the Q2B quantum computing conference, where he presented his research and long-term technological direction. His role involves collaboration in research, engineering, and technology evaluation in the financial sector.

== Research ==
Gonciulea’s research covers algorithmic and software-engineering aspects of quantum computing, with emphasis on optimization, simulation, and applications to financial engineering. He co-authored Building Quantum Software with Python: A Developer’s Guide with Charlee Stefanski, published by Manning in 2025. He has discussed quantum computing in public forums, including the QuEra podcast, The Quantum Insider, and Superposition Guys.

In July 2025, he delivered an ACM Learning TechTalk introducing key concepts in quantum computing for software developers. His publications include work on quantum algorithms and their applications to financial engineering, including A generalized quantum inner product and applications to financial engineering. His works Challenges and opportunities in quantum optimization and Designing a fast and flexible quantum state simulator introduced Spinoza, an open-source Rust-based quantum state simulator with Python bindings. Gonciulea is also listed as an inventor on patents related to distributed quantum computing and quantum visualization.

His publications address the following topics:

- Building blocks for state preparation and distribution encodings (including normal distributions).
- Hash-based generalization of a quantum inner-product approach for weighted sums of discrete functions ($\sum_{k=0}^{N-1} w_k,f(k)$), enabling restricted evaluations (e.g., VaR) and comparator-style quantities.
- Oracle construction for Grover Adaptive Search on constrained binary optimization with near-term resource constraints in mind.
- Automatic oracle generation using a Quantum Dictionary pattern with conditional additions of polynomial coefficients.
- Demonstration on portfolio optimization, using both simulation and real hardware results.
- Spinoza simulator implementation choices and internal representation details.
- Python-facing API via Rust bindings circuit-style interface.

== Selected publications ==
- Building Quantum Software with Python. Charlee Stefansky, Constantin Gonciulea. Manning Publications. Shelter Island NY. 2024. ISBN 9781633437630
- Designing a Fast and Flexible Quantum State Simulator. Saveliy Yusufov, Charlee Stefanski, Constantin Gonciulea. arXiv. arXiv:2303.01493. Ithaca NY. 2023.
- Quantum Combinatorial Optimization in the NISQ Era. Austin Gilliam, Stefan Woerner, Constantin Gonciulea. ACM Computing Surveys. Vol. 55. New York NY. 2023.
- A Generalized Quantum Inner Product and Applications to Financial Engineering. Vanio Markov, Charlee Stefanski, Abhijit Rao, Constantin Gonciulea. arXiv. arXiv:2201.09845. Ithaca NY. 2022.
- Properties of the Discrete Sinc Quantum State and Applications to Measurement Interpolation. Charlee Stefanski, Vanio Markov, Constantin Gonciulea. arXiv. arXiv:2207.00564. Ithaca NY. 2022.
- Efficient Quantum State Preparation for Monte Carlo Integration. Austin Gilliam, Constantin Gonciulea. arXiv. arXiv:2107.10235. Ithaca NY. 2021.
- Quantum Algorithms for Financial Applications. Marco Pistoia, Constantin Gonciulea, Abhijit Rao. arXiv. arXiv:2105.02868. Ithaca NY. 2021.
- Grover Adaptive Search for Constrained Polynomial Binary Optimization. Austin Gilliam, Stefan Woerner, Constantin Gonciulea. Quantum Journal. Vol. 5 Article 428. Switzerland. 2021.
- On the Structure of Quantum Amplitude Amplification. Austin Gilliam, Constantin Gonciulea. arXiv. arXiv:2009.03736. Ithaca NY. 2020.
- Optimizing Quantum Search Using a Generalized Version of Grover’s Algorithm. Austin Gilliam, Marco Pistoia, Constantin Gonciulea. arXiv. arXiv:2005.06468. Ithaca NY. 2020.
- Foundational Patterns for Efficient Quantum Computing. Constantin Gonciulea, Marco Pistoia, Austin Gilliam. arXiv. arXiv:1907.11513. Ithaca NY. 2019.

== See also ==
- Quantum computing
- Quantum simulator
