= Calculus of functors =

Technique for studying functors

In algebraic topology, a branch of mathematics, the calculus of functors or Goodwillie calculus is a technique for studying functors by approximating them by a sequence of simpler functors; it generalizes the sheafification of a presheaf. This sequence of approximations is formally similar to the Taylor series of a smooth function, hence the term "calculus of functors".

Many objects of central interest in algebraic topology can be seen as functors, which are difficult to analyze directly, so the idea is to replace them with simpler functors which are sufficiently good approximations for certain purposes. The calculus of functors was developed by Thomas Goodwillie in a series of three papers in the 1990s and 2000s, and has since been expanded and applied in a number of areas.

== Examples ==
A motivational example, of central interest in geometric topology, is the functor of embeddings of one manifold M into another manifold N, whose first derivative in the sense of calculus of functors is the functor of immersions. As every embedding is an immersion, one obtains an inclusion of functors $\mathrm{Emb}(M,N) \to \mathrm{Imm}(M,N)$ – in this case the map from a functor to an approximation is an inclusion, but in general it is simply a map.

As this example illustrates, the linear approximation of a functor (on a topological space) is its sheafification, thinking of the functor as a presheaf on the space (formally, as a functor on the category of open subsets of the space), and sheaves are the linear functors.

This example was studied by Goodwillie and Michael Weiss.

== Definition ==
Here is an analogy: with the Taylor series method from calculus, you can approximate the shape of a smooth function f around a point x by using a sequence of increasingly accurate polynomial functions. In a similar way, with the calculus of functors method, you can approximate the behavior of certain kind of functor F at a particular object X by using a sequence of increasingly accurate polynomial functors.

To be specific, let M be a smooth manifold and let O(M) be the category of open subspaces of M, i.e., the category where the objects are the open subspaces of M, and the morphisms are inclusion maps. Let F be a contravariant functor from the category O(M) to the category Top of topological spaces with continuous morphisms. This kind of functor, called a Top-valued presheaf on M, is the kind of functor you can approximate using the calculus of functors method: for a particular open set X∈O(M), you may want to know what sort of a topological space F(X) is, so you can study the topology of the increasingly accurate approximations F_{0}(X), F_{1}(X), F_{2}(X), and so on.

In the calculus of functors method, the sequence of approximations consists of (1) functors $T_0F, T_1F, T_2F$, and so on, as well as (2) natural transformations $\eta_k\colon F \to T_kF$ for each integer k. These natural transforms are required to be compatible, meaning that the composition $F \to T_{k+1}F \to T_kF$ equals the map $F \to T_kF,$ and thus form a tower

$$F \to \cdots \to T_{k+1}F \to T_kF \to \cdots \to T_1F \to T_0F,$$

and can be thought of as "successive approximations", just as in a Taylor series one can progressively discard higher order terms.

The approximating functors are required to be "k-excisive" – such functors are called polynomial functors by analogy with Taylor polynomials – which is a simplifying condition, and roughly means that they are determined by their behavior around k points at a time, or more formally are sheaves on the configuration space of k points in the given space. The difference between the kth and $(k-1)$st functors is a "homogeneous functor of degree k" (by analogy with homogeneous polynomials), which can be classified.

For the functors $T_kF$ to be approximations to the original functor F, the resulting approximation maps $F \to T_kF$ must be n-connected for some number n, meaning that the approximating functor approximates the original functor "in dimension up to n"; this may not occur. Further, if one wishes to reconstruct the original functor, the resulting approximations must be n-connected for n increasing to infinity. One then calls F an analytic functor, and says that "the Taylor tower converges to the functor", in analogy with Taylor series of an analytic function.

== Branches ==
There are three branches of the calculus of functors, developed in the order:

- manifold calculus, such as embeddings,
- homotopy calculus, and
- orthogonal calculus.

Homotopy calculus has seen far wider application than the other branches.

== History ==
The notion of a sheaf and sheafification of a presheaf date to early category theory, and can be seen as the linear form of the calculus of functors. The quadratic form can be seen in the work of André Haefliger on links of spheres in 1965, where he defined a "metastable range" in which the problem is simpler. This was identified as the quadratic approximation to the embeddings functor in Goodwillie and Weiss.
