= Thomas Goodwillie (mathematician) =

American mathematician

Thomas G. Goodwillie
- Education: Harvard University (A.B., M.A., 1976); Princeton University (Ph.D., 1982)
- Known for: Calculus of functors
- Scientific career
- Fields: Topology, K-Theory
- Workplaces: Harvard University, Brown University
- Doctoral advisor: Wu-Chung Hsiang

Thomas G. Goodwillie (born 1954) is an American mathematician and professor at Brown University who has made fundamental contributions to algebraic and geometric topology. He is especially famous for developing the concept of the calculus of functors, often also named Goodwillie calculus.

== Life ==
While studying at Harvard University, Goodwillie became a Putnam Fellow in 1974 and 1975. He then studied at Princeton University, where he completed his PhD in 1982, under the supervision of Wu-Chung Hsiang. He returned to Harvard as a Junior Fellow in 1979, and was an associate professor (without tenure) at Harvard from 1982 to 1987. In 1987 he was hired with tenure by Brown University, where he was promoted to full professor in 1991.

He developed the calculus of functors in a series of three papers in the 1990s and 2000s, which have since been expanded and applied in a number of areas, including the theory of smooth manifolds, algebraic K-theory, and homotopy theory.

He has advised 13 PhD students.

== Recognition ==
Goodwillie received a Sloan Fellowship and the Harriet S. Sheridan Award. He is a Fellow of the American Mathematical Society.

A conference with leading topologists as speakers was organized on the occasion of his 60th birthday.
