= Sphere theorem =

Theorem in Riemannian geometry

In Riemannian geometry, the sphere theorem, also known as the quarter-pinched sphere theorem, strongly restricts the topology of manifolds admitting metrics with a particular curvature bound. The precise statement of the theorem is as follows. If $M$ is a complete, simply-connected, n-dimensional Riemannian manifold with sectional curvature taking values in the interval $(1,4]$ then $M$ is homeomorphic to the n-sphere. (To be precise, we mean the sectional curvature of every tangent 2-plane at each point must lie in $(1,4]$.) Another way of stating the result is that if $M$ is not homeomorphic to the sphere, then it is impossible to put a metric on $M$ with quarter-pinched curvature.

Note that the conclusion is false if the sectional curvatures are allowed to take values in the closed interval $[1,4]$. The standard counterexample is complex projective space with the Fubini–Study metric; sectional curvatures of this metric take on values between $1$ and $4$, with endpoints included. Other counterexamples may be found among the rank one symmetric spaces.

== Differentiable sphere theorem ==
The original proof of the sphere theorem did not conclude that $M$ was necessarily diffeomorphic to the n-sphere. This complication is because spheres in higher dimensions admit smooth structures that are not diffeomorphic. (For more information, see the article on exotic spheres.) However, in 2007 Simon Brendle and Richard Schoen utilized Ricci flow to prove that with the above hypotheses, $M$ is necessarily diffeomorphic to the n-sphere with its standard smooth structure. Moreover, the proof of Brendle and Schoen only uses the weaker assumption of pointwise rather than global pinching. This result is known as the differentiable sphere theorem.

== History of the sphere theorem ==
Heinz Hopf conjectured that a simply connected manifold with pinched sectional curvature is a sphere. In 1951, Harry Rauch showed that a simply connected manifold with curvature in $[3/4,1]$ is homeomorphic to a sphere. In 1960, both Marcel Berger and Wilhelm Klingenberg proved the topological version of the sphere theorem with the optimal pinching constant. Berger discusses the history of the theorem in his book A Panoramic View of Riemannian Geometry, originally published in 2003.
