= Hopfian object =

Mathematical object

In the branch of mathematics called category theory, a hopfian object is an object A such that any epimorphism of A onto A is necessarily an automorphism. The dual notion is that of a cohopfian object, which is an object B such that every monomorphism from B into B is necessarily an automorphism. The two conditions have been studied in the categories of groups, rings, modules, and topological spaces.

The terms "hopfian" and "cohopfian" have arisen since the 1960s, and are said to be in honor of Heinz Hopf and his use of the concept of the hopfian group in his work on fundamental groups of surfaces. (Hazewinkel 2001, p. 63)

== Properties ==
Both conditions may be viewed as types of finiteness conditions in their category. For example, assuming Zermelo–Fraenkel set theory with the axiom of choice and working in the category of sets, the hopfian and cohopfian objects are precisely the finite sets. From this it is easy to see that all finite groups, finite modules and finite rings are hopfian and cohopfian in their categories.

Hopfian objects and cohopfian objects have an elementary interaction with projective objects and injective objects. The two results are:

- An injective hopfian object is cohopfian.
- A projective cohopfian object is hopfian.

The proof for the first statement is short: Let A be an injective hopfian object, and let f be an injective morphism from A to A. By injectivity, f factors through the identity map I_{A} on A, yielding a morphism g such that gf=I_{A}. As a result, g is a surjective morphism and hence an automorphism, and then f is necessarily the inverse automorphism to g. This proof can be dualized to prove the second statement.

== Hopfian and cohopfian modules ==
Here are several basic results in the category of modules. It is especially important to remember that R_{R} being hopfian or cohopfian as a module is different from R being hopfian or cohopfian as a ring.

- A Noetherian module is hopfian, and an Artinian module is cohopfian.
- The module R_{R} is hopfian if and only if R is a directly finite ring. Symmetrically, these two are also equivalent to the module _{R}R being hopfian.
- In contrast with the above, the modules R_{R} or _{R}R can be cohopfian or not in any combination. An example of a ring cohopfian on one side but not the other side was given in (Varadarajan 1992). However, if either of these two modules is cohopfian, R is hopfian on both sides (since R is projective as a left or right module) and directly finite.

== Hopfian and cohopfian rings ==
The situation in the category of rings is quite different from the category of modules. The morphisms in the category of rings with unity are required to preserve the identity, that is, to send 1 to 1.

- If R satisfies the ascending chain condition on ideals, then R is hopfian. This can be proven by analogy with the fact for Noetherian modules. The counterpart idea for "cohopfian" does not exist however, since if f is a ring homomorphism from R into R preserving identity, and the image of f is not R, then the image is certainly not an ideal of R. In any case, this shows that a one sided Noetherian or Artinian ring is always hopfian.
- Any simple ring is hopfian, since the kernel of any endomorphism is an ideal, which is necessarily zero in a simple ring. In contrast, in (Varadarajan 1992), an example of a non-cohopfian field was given.
- The full linear ring End_{D}(V) of a countable dimensional vector space is a hopfian ring which is not hopfian as a module, since it only has three ideals, but it is not directly finite. The paper (Varadarajan 1992) also gives an example of a cohopfian ring which is not cohopfian as a module.
- Also in (Varadarajan 1992), it is shown that for a Boolean ring R and its associated Stone space X, the ring R is hopfian in the category of rings if and only if X is cohopfian in the category of topological spaces, and R is cohopfian as a ring if and only if X is hopfian as a topological space.

== Hopfian and cohopfian topological spaces ==
- In (Varadarajan 1992), a series of results on compact manifolds are included. Firstly, the only compact manifolds which are hopfian are finite discrete spaces. Secondly, compact manifolds without boundary are always cohopfian. Lastly, compact manifolds with nonempty boundary are not cohopfian.
