= Michael W. Davis =

American mathematician (born 1949)

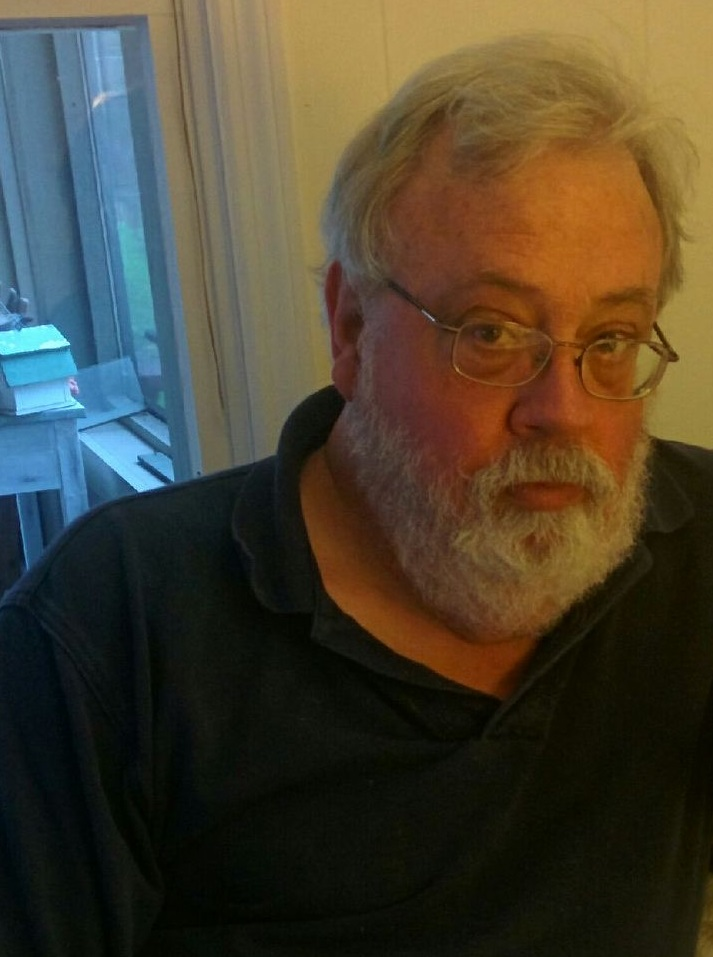
- Born: April 26, 1949 (age 77)
- Occupations: Mathematician, author, and academic

Academic background
- Education: Princeton University (BA, PhD)
- Thesis: Smooth Actions of the Classical Groups (1975)
- Doctoral advisor: Wu-Chung Hsiang

Academic work
- Institutions: Massachusetts Institute of Technology; Columbia University; Ohio State University
- Doctoral students: Constantin Gonciulea
- Website: people.math.osu.edu/davis.12/

Michael W. Davis (born April 26, 1949) is an American mathematician, author and academic. He is a Professor Emeritus of mathematics at the Ohio State University.

Davis is most known for his work in the fields of geometry and topology, with a focus on the methods for constructing aspherical manifolds and spaces. He is the author of two books that include The Geometry and Topology of Coxeter Groups and Multiaxial Actions on Manifolds. His notable contributions to the field of mathematics include the creation of several mathematical concepts, such as the Charney–Davis Conjecture, Davis–Moussong complex, Davis manifolds, Davis–Januszkiewicz space, and the reflection group trick.

== Early life and education ==
Davis attended Princeton University where he earned a bachelor's degree in 1971. He then completed a PhD in mathematics at the same institution under the supervision of Wu-Chung Hsiang in 1975 with a thesis titled "Smooth Actions of the Classical Groups".

== Career ==
Following his PhD, Davis held an appointment as a Moore Instructor of Mathematics at the Massachusetts Institute of Technology from 1974 to 1976. Starting in 1977, he worked as an assistant professor at Columbia University until 1982. Later, in 1983 he was appointed as an associate professor in the Department of Mathematics at the Ohio State University and was promoted to Professor in 1988, a position in which he served until his retirement in 2022. Since 2022, he has been Professor Emeritus at the Ohio State University.

In June, 2009 an international conference on geometric group theory was held in honor of his 60th birthday at the conference center in Będlewo. He became a Fellow of the American Mathematical Society in 2015. In May, 2025 an international conference on the geometry and topology of polyhedral complexes was held in honor of his 75th birthday at Ohio State.

== Research ==
Davis has worked in the fields of topology and geometric group theory. At the beginning of his career, his research concerned Lie group actions on manifolds. Later, he started working on aspherical spaces and co-authored a foundational paper on toric topology.

=== Aspherical manifolds and nonpositive curvature ===
Davis is most known for his seminal works in the area of aspherical manifolds. He is credited with pioneering the use of reflection groups in the construction of aspherical manifolds, which led to the creation of numerous examples of aspherical manifolds with universal covers not homeomorphic to Euclidean space. In collaborations with Tadeusz Januszkiewicz and Ruth Charney, he established the "hyperbolization" method for using nonpositive curvature to construct aspherical manifolds. His contributions also include the construction in 1998 of exotic Poincaré duality groups by using the Reflection Group trick in 1998.

=== Coxeter groups ===
Davis has conducted research on Coxeter groups, Artin groups, and buildings. In his book, The Geometry and Topology of Coxeter Groups, he constructs the Davis complexes for Coxeter groups and he describes foundational results about these spaces to establish properties at infinity of Coxeter groups. In his book he also discusses the recent work on L² cohomology of Coxeter groups, Artin groups, and buildings. John Meier expressed his admiration of this book and stated “None of the other books on Coxeter groups provides the same insights into the geometry of infinite Coxeter groups that is available in Davis’s book." In collaboration with Boris Okun, he worked on the Singer Conjecture for right-angled Coxeter groups.

== Bibliography ==
=== Books ===
- Davis, Michael W. (1978). Multiaxial actions on manifolds. Lecture notes in mathematics. Vol. 643. Berlin, Heidelberg: Springer. doi:10.1007/BFb0065343. ISBN 978-3-540-08667-3. MR 0488195.
- Davis, Michael (2008). The geometry and topology of Coxeter groups. London Mathematical Society monographs series. Vol. 32. Princeton: Princeton University Press. ISBN 978-0-691-13138-2. MR 2360474. OCLC 77485786.

== Selected articles ==
- Davis, Michael W.; Januszkiewicz, Tadeusz (1983). "Groups generated by reflections and aspherical manifolds not covered by Euclidean space". Annals of Mathematics. 117 (2): 293–324. doi:10.2307/2007079. JSTOR 2007079. MR 0690848.
- Davis, Michael W.; Januszkiewicz, Tadeusz (March 17, 1991). "Convex polytopes, Coxeter orbifolds and torus actions". Duke Mathematical Journal. 62 (2): 417–451. doi:10.1215/S0012-7094-91-06217-4. MR 1104531.
- Davis, Michael W.; Januszkiewicz, Tadeusz (January 17, 1991). "Hyperbolization of polyhedra". Journal of Differential Geometry. 34 (2): 347–388. doi:10.4310/jdg/1214447212. MR 1131435.
- Charney, Ruth; Davis, Michael W. (1995). "The Euler characteristic of a nonpositively curved, Piecewise Euclidean manifold" (PDF). Pacific Journal of Mathematics. 171 (1): 117–137. doi:10.2140/pjm.1995.171.117. MR 1362980.
- Charney, Ruth; Davis, Michael W. (1995). "The K(π,1)-problem for hyperplane complements associated to infinite reflections groups". Journal of the American Mathematical Society. 8 (3): 597–627. doi:10.2307/2152924. JSTOR 2152924. MR 1303028.
- Davis, Michael W.; Okun, Boris (February 2, 2001). "Vanishing theorems and conjectures for the $\ell^2$–homology of right-angled Coxeter groups". Geometry & Topology. 5 (1): 7–74. arXiv:math/0102104. doi:10.2140/gt.2001.5.7. MR 1812434. S2CID 53521054.
- Davis, Michael W.; Huang, Jingyin (2021). "Bordifications of hyperplane arrangements and their curve complexes". Journal of Topology. 14 (2): 419–451. arXiv:2003.13553. doi:10.1112/topo.12184. MR 4235015.
