= Topological degree theory =

In mathematics, topological degree theory is a generalization of the winding number of a curve in the complex plane. It can be used to estimate the number of solutions of an equation, and is closely connected to fixed-point theory. When one solution of an equation is easily found, degree theory can often be used to prove the existence of a second, nontrivial, solution. There are different types of degree for different types of maps: e.g. for maps between Banach spaces there is the Brouwer degree in R^{n}, the Leray-Schauder degree for compact mappings in normed spaces, the coincidence degree and various other types. There is also a degree for continuous maps between manifolds.

Topological degree theory has applications in complementarity problems, differential equations, differential inclusions and dynamical systems.
