= Hopf theorem =

Topological degree is the only homotopy invariant of continuous maps to spheres

The Hopf theorem (named after Heinz Hopf) is a statement in differential topology, saying that the topological degree is the only homotopy invariant of continuous maps to spheres.

== Formal statement ==
Let M be an n-dimensional compact connected oriented manifold and $S^n$ the n-sphere and $f,g\colon M\to S^n$ be continuous. Then $\deg(f)=\deg(g)$ if and only if f and g are homotopic.
