= Hopfian group =

In mathematics, a Hopfian group is a group G for which every surjective homomorphism G → G is an isomorphism. Equivalently, a group is Hopfian if and only if it is not isomorphic to any of its proper quotients.

A group G is co-Hopfian if every injective homomorphism G → G is an isomorphism. Equivalently, G is not isomorphic to any of its proper subgroups.

Hopfian groups are named after Heinz Hopf.

== Examples of Hopfian groups ==
- Every finite group, by an elementary counting argument.
- More generally, every polycyclic-by-finite group.
- Any finitely generated free group.
- The additive group $\Q$ of rationals.
- Any finitely generated residually finite group.
- Any word-hyperbolic group.

== Examples of non-Hopfian groups ==
- Quasicyclic groups.
- The additive group $\R$ of real numbers.
- The Baumslag–Solitar group $B(2,3)$. In general $B(m,n)$ is non-Hopfian if and only if there exists primes $p$ and $q$ with $p\mid m$, $q\mid n$ and $p\nmid n$, $q\nmid m$.

== Properties ==
It was shown by Collins that it is an undecidable problem to determine, given a finite presentation of a group, whether the group is Hopfian. Unlike the undecidability of many properties of groups, this is not a consequence of the Adian–Rabin theorem because Hopficity is not a Markov property.
