= Novikov conjecture =

Unsolved problem in topology

The Novikov conjecture is one of the most important unsolved problems in topology. It is named for Sergei Novikov who originally posed the conjecture in 1965.

The Novikov conjecture concerns the homotopy invariance of certain polynomials in the Pontryagin classes of a manifold, arising from the fundamental group. According to the Novikov conjecture, the higher signatures, which are certain numerical invariants of smooth manifolds, are homotopy invariants.

The conjecture has been proved for finitely generated abelian groups. It is not yet known whether the Novikov conjecture holds true for all groups. There are no known counterexamples to the conjecture.

== Precise formulation of the conjecture ==
Let $G$ be a discrete group and $BG$ its classifying space, which is an Eilenberg–MacLane space of type $K(G,1)$, and therefore unique up to homotopy equivalence as a CW complex. Let

$$f\colon M\rightarrow BG$$

be a continuous map from a closed oriented $n$-dimensional manifold $M$ to $BG$, and

$$x \in H^{n-4i} (BG;\mathbb{Q} ).$$

Novikov considered the numerical expression, found by evaluating the cohomology class in top dimension against the fundamental class $[M]$, and known as a higher signature:

$$\left\langle f^*(x) \cup L_i(M),[M] \right\rangle \in \mathbb{Q}$$

where $L_i$ is the $i^{\rm th}$ Hirzebruch polynomial, or sometimes (less descriptively) as the $i^{\rm th}$ $L$-polynomial. For each $i$, this polynomial can be expressed in the Pontryagin classes of the manifold's tangent bundle. The Novikov conjecture states that the higher signature is an invariant of the oriented homotopy type of $M$ for every such map $f$ and every such class $x$, in other words, if $h\colon M' \rightarrow M$ is an orientation preserving homotopy equivalence, the higher signature associated to $f \circ h$ is equal to that associated to $f$.

== Connection with the Borel conjecture ==
The Novikov conjecture is equivalent to the rational injectivity of the assembly map in L-theory. The Borel conjecture on the rigidity of aspherical manifolds is equivalent to the assembly map being an isomorphism.
