= Borel conjecture =

Conjecture in geometric topology

In geometric topology, the Borel conjecture (named for Armand Borel) asserts that an aspherical closed manifold is determined by its fundamental group, up to homeomorphism. It is a rigidity conjecture, asserting that a weak, algebraic notion of equivalence (namely, homotopy equivalence) should imply a stronger, topological notion (namely, homeomorphism).

== Precise formulation of the conjecture ==
Let $M$ and $N$ be closed and aspherical topological manifolds, and let

$$f \colon M \to N$$

be a homotopy equivalence. The Borel conjecture states that the map $f$ is homotopic to a homeomorphism. Since aspherical manifolds with isomorphic fundamental groups are homotopy equivalent, the Borel conjecture implies that aspherical closed manifolds are determined, up to homeomorphism, by their fundamental groups.

This conjecture is false if topological manifolds and homeomorphisms are replaced by smooth manifolds and diffeomorphisms; counterexamples can be constructed by taking a connected sum with an exotic sphere.

== The origin of the conjecture ==
In a May 1953 letter to Jean-Pierre Serre, Armand Borel raised the question whether two aspherical manifolds with isomorphic fundamental groups are homeomorphic. A positive answer to the question "Is every homotopy equivalence between closed aspherical manifolds homotopic to a homeomorphism?" is referred to as the "so-called Borel Conjecture" in a 1986 paper of Jonathan Rosenberg.

== Motivation for the conjecture ==
A basic question is the following: if two closed manifolds are homotopy equivalent, are they homeomorphic? This is not true in general: there are homotopy equivalent lens spaces which are not homeomorphic.

Nevertheless, there are classes of manifolds for which homotopy equivalences between them can be homotoped to homeomorphisms. For instance, the Mostow rigidity theorem states that a homotopy equivalence between closed hyperbolic manifolds is homotopic to an isometry—in particular, to a homeomorphism. The Borel conjecture is a topological reformulation of Mostow rigidity, weakening the hypothesis from hyperbolic manifolds to aspherical manifolds, and similarly weakening the conclusion from an isometry to a homeomorphism.

== Relationship to other conjectures ==
- The Borel conjecture implies the Novikov conjecture for the special case in which the reference map $f \colon M \to BG$ is a homotopy equivalence.
- The Poincaré conjecture asserts that a closed manifold homotopy equivalent to $S^3$, the 3-sphere, is homeomorphic to $S^3$. This is not a special case of the Borel conjecture, because $S^3$ is not aspherical. Nevertheless, the Borel conjecture for the 3-torus $T^3 = S^1 \times S^1 \times S^1$ implies the Poincaré conjecture for $S^3$.
