= Ruth Charney =

American mathematician

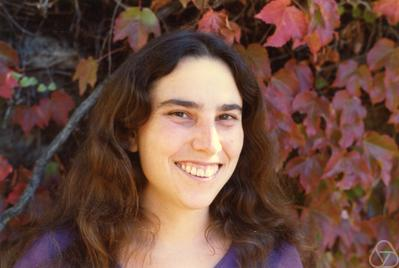
- Ruth Charney in 1977
- Born: 1950 (age 75–76)
- Education: Brandeis University; Princeton University
- Known for: Geometric group theory, Artin groups
- Awards: President of Association for Women in Mathematics; President of the American Mathematical Society; Fellow of the American Mathematical Society; Fellow of the Association for Women in Mathematics
- Scientific career
- Fields: Mathematics
- Workplaces: Brandeis University
- Thesis: Homological Stability for the General Linear Group of a Principal Ideal Domain (1977)
- Doctoral advisor: Wu-Chung Hsiang

Ruth Michele Charney (born 1950) is an American mathematician known for her work in geometric group theory and Artin groups. Other areas of research include K-theory and algebraic topology. She holds the Theodore and Evelyn G. Berenson Chair in Mathematics at Brandeis University. She was in the first group of mathematicians named Fellows of the American Mathematical Society. She was in the first group of mathematicians named Fellows of the Association for Women in Mathematics. She served as president of the Association for Women in Mathematics during 2013–2015, and served as president of the American Mathematical Society for the 2021–2023 term.

== Life ==
Charney attended Brandeis University, graduating in mathematics in 1972. She then attended Merce Cunningham's dance studio for a year, studying modern dance. She received her Ph.D. from Princeton University in 1977 under Wu-Chung Hsiang.

== Work ==
Following her graduation from Princeton, Charney took a postdoctoral position at University of California, Berkeley, followed by an NSF postdoctoral appointment/assistant professor position at Yale University. She worked for Ohio State University until 2003, when she returned to work at Brandeis University.

Charney served as president of the Association for Women in Mathematics during 2013–2015. She emphasized the importance of encouraging young women in mathematics through summer programs, mentorships, and parental involvement.

She has served as an editor of the journal Algebraic and Geometric Topology from 2000 to 2007.

In 2019 she was elected to serve as president of the American Mathematical Society during 2021–2023. She currently serves as the AMS Immediate Past President.

Additionally, she was a member at large for the American Mathematical Society from 1992 to 1994.

== Honors ==
- In 2013 Charney was named a Fellow of the American Mathematical Society in the inaugural class.
- In 2017 she was selected as a Fellow of the Association for Women in Mathematics in the inaugural class.

== Selected publications ==
- Charney, Ruth; Davis, Michael W. Finite K(π,1)s for Artin groups. Prospects in topology (Princeton, NJ, 1994), 110–124, Ann. of Math. Stud., 138, Princeton Univ. Press, Princeton, NJ, 1995. MR1368655
- Charney, Ruth Geodesic automation and growth functions for Artin groups of finite type. Math. Ann. 301 (1995), no. 2, 307–324. MR1314589
- Charney, Ruth Artin groups of finite type are biautomatic. Math. Ann. 292 (1992), no. 4, 671–683. MR1157320
- Charney, Ruth An introduction to right-angled Artin groups. Geom. Dedicata 125 (2007), 141–158. MR2322545
