= Baumslag–Gersten group =

Geometric group theory

In the mathematical subject of geometric group theory, the Baumslag–Gersten group, also known as the Baumslag group, is a particular one-relator group exhibiting some remarkable properties regarding its finite quotient groups, its Dehn function and the complexity of its word problem.

The group is given by the presentation

$$G=\langle a,t \mid a^{a^t}=a^2\rangle =\langle a, t \mid (t^{-1}a^{-1}t) a (t^{-1} at)=a^2 \rangle$$

Here exponential notation for group elements denotes conjugation, that is, $g^h=h^{-1}gh$ for $g, h\in G$.

== History ==
The Baumslag–Gersten group G was originally introduced in a 1969 paper of Gilbert Baumslag, as an example of a non-residually finite one-relator group with an additional remarkable property that all finite quotient groups of this group are cyclic. Later, in 1992, Stephen Gersten showed that G, despite being a one-relator group given by a rather simple presentation, has the Dehn function growing very quickly, namely faster than any fixed iterate of the exponential function. This example remains the fastest known growth of the Dehn function among one-relator groups. In 2011 Alexei Myasnikov, Alexander Ushakov, and Dong Wook Won proved that G has the word problem solvable in polynomial time.

== Baumslag-Gersten group as an HNN extension ==
The Baumslag–Gersten group G can also be realized as an HNN extension of the Baumslag–Solitar group $BS(1,2)=\langle a, b\mid a^b=a^2\rangle$ with stable letter t and two cyclic associated subgroups$\langle a\rangle, \langle b\rangle$:

$$G=\langle a,t \mid a^{a^t}=a^2\rangle=\langle a,b,t \mid a^b=a^2, a^t=b\rangle.$$

== Properties of the Baumslag–Gersten group G ==
- Every finite quotient group of G is cyclic. In particular, the group G is not residually finite.
- An endomorphism of G is either an automorphism or its image is a cyclic subgroup of G. In particular the group G is Hopfian and co-Hopfian.
- The outer automorphism group Out(G) of G is isomorphic to the additive group of dyadic rationals $\mathbb Z\left[\frac{1}{2}\right]$ and in particular is not finitely generated.
- Gersten proved that the Dehn function f(n) of G grows faster than any fixed iterate of the exponential. Subsequently A. N. Platonov proved that f(n) is equivalent to

$$\exp^{\circ\log n}(1)=(\exp\underbrace{\circ \cdots  \circ}_{\log n \text{ times } } \exp)(1)$$

- Myasnikov, Ushakov, and Won, using compression methods of "power circuits" arithmetics, proved that the word problem in G is solvable in polynomial time. Thus the group G exhibits a large gap between the growth of its Dehn function and the complexity of its word problem.
- The conjugacy problem in G is known to be decidable, but the only known worst-case upper bound estimate for the complexity of the conjugacy problem, due to Jannis Beese, is elementary recursive. It is conjectured that this estimate is sharp, based on some reductions to power circuit division problems. There is a strongly generically polynomial time solution of the conjugacy problem for G.

== Generalizations ==
- Andrew Brunner considered one-relator groups of the form

$\langle a,t\mid (a^p)^{(t^{-1}a^kt)}=a^m \rangle,$ where $p,k,m\ne 0$

and generalized many of Baumslag's original results in that context.

- Mahan Mitra considered a word-hyperbolic analog G of the Baumslag–Gersten group, where Mitra's group possesses a rank three free subgroup that is highly distorted in G, namely where the subgroup distortion is higher than any fixed iterated power of the exponential.

== See also ==
- Subgroup distortion
