= One-relator group =

Type of group in mathematics

In the mathematical subject of group theory, a one-relator group is a group given by a group presentation with a single defining relation. One-relator groups play an important role in geometric group theory by providing many explicit examples of finitely presented groups.

== Formal definition ==
A one-relator group is a group G that admits a group presentation of the form

$G=\langle X\mid r=1\, \rangle$	1

where X is a set (in general possibly infinite), and where $r\in F(X)$ is a freely and cyclically reduced word.

If Y is the set of all letters $x\in X$ that appear in r and $X'=X\setminus Y$ then

$$G=\langle Y\mid  r=1\,  \rangle \ast F(X').$$

For that reason X in (1) is usually assumed to be finite where one-relator groups are discussed, in which case (1) can be rewritten more explicitly as

$G=\langle x_1,\dots, x_n\mid r=1\, \rangle,$	2

where $X=\{x_1, \dots, x_n\}$ for some integer $n\ge 1.$

== Freiheitssatz ==
Let G be a one-relator group given by presentation (1) above. Recall that r is a freely and cyclically reduced word in F(X). Let $y\in X$ be a letter such that $y$ or $y^{-1}$ appears in r. Let $X_1\subseteq X\setminus \{y\}$. The subgroup $H=\langle X_1\rangle\le G$ is called a Magnus subgroup of G.

A famous 1930 theorem of Wilhelm Magnus, known as Freiheitssatz, states that in this situation H is freely generated by $X_1$, that is, $H=F(X_1)$. See also for other proofs.

== Properties of one-relator groups ==
Here we assume that a one-relator group G is given by presentation (2) with a finite generating set $X=\{x_1,\dots, x_n\}$ and a nontrivial freely and cyclically reduced defining relation $1\ne r\in F(X)$.

- A one-relator group G is torsion-free if and only if $r\in F(x_1,\ldots,x_n)$ is not a proper power.
- Every one-relator group G is virtually torsion-free, that is, admits a torsion-free subgroup of finite index.
- Every one-relator group is coherent. That is, every finitely generated subgroup is finitely presented.
- A one-relator presentation is diagrammatically aspherical.
- If $r\in F(x_1,\ldots,x_n)$ is not a proper power then the presentation complex P for presentation (2) is a finite Eilenberg–MacLane complex $K(G,1)$.
- If $r\in F(x_1,\ldots,x_n)$ is not a proper power then a one-relator group G has cohomological dimension $\le 2$.
- A one-relator group G is free if and only if $r\in F(x_1,\ldots,x_n)$ is a primitive element or the empty word; in the case of a primitive word G is free of rank n − 1, in the case of the empty word it is free of rank n.
- Suppose the element $r\in F(x_1,\ldots,x_n)$ is of minimal length under the action of $\operatorname{Aut}(F_n)$, and suppose that for every $i=1,\dots,n$ either $x_i$ or $x_i^{-1}$ occurs in r. Then the group G is freely indecomposable.
- If $r\in F(x_1,\ldots,x_n)$ is not a proper power then a one-relator group G is locally indicable, that is, every nontrivial finitely generated subgroup of G admits a group homomorphism onto $\mathbb Z$.
- Every one-relator group G has algorithmically decidable word problem.
- If G is a one-relator group and $H\le G$ is a Magnus subgroup then the subgroup membership problem for H in G is decidable.
- It is unknown if one-relator groups have solvable conjugacy problem.
- It is unknown if the isomorphism problem is decidable for the class of one-relator groups.
- A one-relator group G given by presentation (2) has rank n (that is, it cannot be generated by fewer than n elements) unless $r\in F(x_1,\ldots,x_n)$ is a primitive element.
- Let G be a one-relator group given by presentation (2). If $n\ge 3$ then the center of G is trivial, $Z(G)=\{1\}$. If $n=2$ and G is non-abelian with non-trivial center, then the center of G is infinite cyclic.
- Let $r,s\in F(X)$ where $X=\{x_1,\dots, x_n\}$. Let $N_1=\langle\langle r\rangle\rangle_{F(X)}$ and $N_2=\langle\langle s\rangle\rangle_{F(X)}$ be the normal closures of r and s in F(X) accordingly. Then $N_1=N_2$ if and only if $r$ is conjugate to $s$ or $s^{-1}$ in F(X).
- There exists a finitely generated one-relator group that is not Hopfian and therefore not residually finite, for example the Baumslag–Solitar group $B(2,3)=\langle a,b\mid b^{-1}a^2b=a^3\rangle$.
- Let G be a one-relator group given by presentation (2). Then G satisfies the following version of the Tits alternative. If G is torsion-free then every subgroup of G either contains a free group of rank 2 or is solvable. If G has nontrivial torsion, then every subgroup of G either contains a free group of rank 2, or is cyclic, or is infinite dihedral.
- Let G be a one-relator group given by presentation (2). Then the normal subgroup $N=\langle\langle r\rangle\rangle_{F(X)}\le F(X)$ admits a free basis of the form $\{u_i^{-1}ru_i\mid i\in I\}$ for some family of elements $\{u_i\in F(X)\mid i\in I\}$.

== One-relator groups with torsion ==
Suppose a one-relator group G given by presentation (2) where $r=s^m$ where $m\ge 2$ and where $1\ne s\in F(X)$ is not a proper power (and thus s is also freely and cyclically reduced). Then the following hold:

- The element s has order m in G, and every element of finite order in G is conjugate to a power of s.
- Every finite subgroup of G is conjugate to a subgroup of $\langle s\rangle$ in G. Moreover, the subgroup of G generated by all torsion elements is a free product of a family of conjugates of $\langle s\rangle$ in G.
- G admits a torsion-free normal subgroup of finite index.
- Newman's "spelling theorem" Let $1\ne w\in F(X)$ be a freely reduced word such that $w=1$ in G. Then w contains a subword v such that v is also a subword of $r$ or $r^{-1}$ of length $|v|=1+(m-1)|s|$. Since $m\ge 2$ that means that $|v|>|r|/2$ and presentation (2) of G is a Dehn presentation.
- G has virtual cohomological dimension $\le 2$.
- G is a word-hyperbolic group.
- G has decidable conjugacy problem.
- G is coherent, that is every finitely generated subgroup of G is finitely presentable.
- The isomorphism problem is decidable for finitely generated one-relator groups with torsion, by virtue of their hyperbolicity.
- G is residually finite.
- $G$ is virtually free-by-cyclic, i.e. $G$ has a subgroup $H$ of finite-index such that there is a free normal subgroup $F \triangleleft H$ with cyclic quotient $F/H$.

== Magnus–Moldavansky method ==
Starting with the work of Magnus in the 1930s, most general results about one-relator groups are proved by induction on the length |r| of the defining relator r. The presentation below follows Section 6 of Chapter II of Lyndon and Schupp and Section 4.4 of Magnus, Karrass and Solitar for Magnus' original approach and Section 5 of Chapter IV of Lyndon and Schupp for the Moldavansky's HNN-extension version of that approach.

Let G be a one-relator group given by presentation (1) with a finite generating set X. Assume also that every generator from X actually occurs in r.

One can usually assume that $\#X\ge 2$ (since otherwise G is cyclic and whatever statement is being proved about G is usually obvious).

The main case to consider when some generator, say t, from X occurs in r with exponent sum 0 on t. Say $X=\{t, a, b,\dots, z\}$ in this case. For every generator $x\in X\setminus \{t\}$ one denotes $x_i=t^{-i}xt^i$ where $i\in \mathbb Z$. Then r can be rewritten as a word $r_0$ in these new generators $X_{\infty}= \{(a_i)_i, (b_i)_i, \dots, (z_i)_i\}$ with $|r_0|<|r|$.

For example, if $r=t^{-2}bt a t^3b^{-2}a^2t^{-1}at^{-1}$ then $r_0=b_2a_1b_{-2}^{-2}a_{-2}^2a_{-1}$.

Let $X_0$ be the alphabet consisting of the portion of $X_{\infty}$ given by all $x_i$ with $m(x)\le i\le M(x)$ where $m(x), M(x)$ are the minimum and the maximum subscripts with which $x_i^{\pm 1}$ occurs in $r_0$.

Magnus observed that the subgroup $L=\langle X_0\rangle \le G$ is itself a one-relator group with the one-relator presentation $L=\langle X_0\mid r_0=1\rangle$. Note that since $|r_0|<|r|$, one can usually apply the inductive hypothesis to $L$ when proving a particular statement about G.

Moreover, if $X_i=t^{-i}X_0t^i$ for $i\in \mathbb Z$ then $L_i=\langle X_i\rangle=\langle X_i| r_i=1\rangle$ is also a one-relator group, where $r_i$ is obtained from $r_0$ by shifting all subscripts by $i$. Then the normal closure $N=\langle \langle X_0\rangle\rangle_G$ of $X_0$ in G is

$$N=\left\langle \bigcup_{i\in \mathbb Z} L_i \right\rangle.$$

Magnus' original approach exploited the fact that N is actually an iterated amalgamated product of the groups $L_i$, amalgamated along suitably chosen Magnus free subgroups. His proof of Freiheitssatz and of the solution of the word problem for one-relator groups was based on this approach.

Later Moldavansky simplified the framework and noted that in this case G itself is an HNN-extension of L with associated subgroups being Magnus free subgroups of L.

If for every generator from $X_0$ its minimum and maximum subscripts in $r_0$ are equal then $G=L\ast \langle t\rangle$ and the inductive step is usually easy to handle in this case.

Suppose then that some generator from $X_0$ occurs in $r_0$ with at least two distinct subscripts. We put $Y_-$ to be the set of all generators from $X_0$ with non-maximal subscripts and we put $Y_+$ to be the set of all generators from $X_0$ with non-maximal subscripts. (Hence every generator from $Y_-$ and from $Y_-$ occurs in $r_0$ with a non-unique subscript.) Then $H_-=\langle Y_-\rangle$ and $H_+=\langle Y_+\rangle$ are free Magnus subgroups of L and $t^{-1}H_- t=H_+$. Moldavansky observed that in this situation

$$G=\langle L, t\mid t^{-1}H_- t=H_+\rangle$$

is an HNN-extension of L. This fact often allows proving something about G using the inductive hypothesis about the one-relator group L via the use of normal form methods and structural algebraic properties for the HNN-extension G.

The general case, both in Magnus' original setting and in Moldavansky's simplification of it, requires treating the situation where no generator from X occurs with exponent sum 0 in r. Suppose that distinct letters $x,y\in X$ occur in r with nonzero exponents $\alpha, \beta$ accordingly. Consider a homomorphism $f:F(X)\to F(X)$ given by $f(x)=xy^{-\beta}, f(y)=y^\alpha$ and fixing the other generators from X. Then for $r'=f(r)\in F(X)$ the exponent sum on y is equal to 0. The map f induces a group homomorphism $\phi: G\to G'=\langle X\mid r'=1\rangle$ that turns out to be an embedding. The one-relator group G' can then be treated using Moldavansky's approach. When $G'$ splits as an HNN-extension of a one-relator group L, the defining relator $r_0$ of L still turns out to be shorter than r, allowing for inductive arguments to proceed. Magnus' original approach used a similar version of an embedding trick for dealing with this case.

== Two-generator one-relator groups ==
It turns out that many two-generator one-relator groups split as semidirect products $G=F_m\rtimes\mathbb Z$. This fact was observed by Ken Brown when analyzing the BNS-invariant of one-relator groups using the Magnus-Moldavansky method.

Namely, let G be a one-relator group given by presentation (2) with $n=2$ and let $\phi:G\to \mathbb Z$ be an epimorphism. One can then change a free basis of $F(X)$ to a basis $t,a$ such that $\phi(t)=1,\phi(a)=0$ and rewrite the presentation of G in this generators as

$$G=\langle a,t\mid r=1\rangle$$

where $1\ne r=r(a,t)\in F(a,t)$ is a freely and cyclically reduced word.

Since $\phi(r)=0, \phi(t)=1$, the exponent sum on t in r is equal to 0. Again putting $a_i=t^{-i}at^i$, we can rewrite r as a word $r_0$ in $(a_i)_{i\in \mathbb Z}.$ Let $m,M$ be the minimum and the maximum subscripts of the generators occurring in $r_0$. Brown showed that $\ker(\phi)$ is finitely generated if and only if $m<M$ and both $a_m$ and $a_{M}$ occur exactly once in $r_0$, and moreover, in that case the group $\ker(\phi)$ is free. Therefore if $\phi:G\to \mathbb Z$ is an epimorphism with a finitely generated kernel, then G splits as $G=F_m\rtimes \mathbb Z$ where $F_m=\ker(\phi)$ is a finite rank free group.

Later Dunfield and Thurston proved that if a one-relator two-generator group $G=\langle x_1,x_2\mid r=1\rangle$ is chosen "at random" (that is, a cyclically reduced word r of length n in $F(x_1,x_2)$ is chosen uniformly at random) then the probability $p_n$ that a homomorphism from G onto $\mathbb Z$ with a finitely generated kernel exists satisfies

$$0.0006<p_n<0.975$$

for all sufficiently large n. Moreover, their experimental data indicates that the limiting value for $p_n$ is close to $0.94$.

== Examples of one-relator groups ==
- Free abelian group $\mathbb Z\times \mathbb Z=\langle a, b \mid a^{-1}b^{-1}ab=1\rangle$
- Baumslag–Solitar group $B(m, n)=\langle a,b\mid b^{-1} a^m b= a^n\rangle$ where $m,n\ne 0$.
- Torus knot group $G=\langle a, b\mid a^p=b^q\rangle$ where $p,q\ge 1$ are coprime integers.
- Baumslag–Gersten group $G=\langle a,t \mid a^{a^t}=a^2\rangle =\langle a, t \mid (t^{-1}a^{-1}t) a (t^{-1} at)=a^2 \rangle$
- Oriented surface group $G=\langle a_1, b_1, \dots, a_n, b_n\mid [a_1,b_1]\dots [a_n,b_n]=1\rangle$ where $[a,b]=a^{-1}b^{-1}ab$ and where $n\ge 1$.
- Non-oriented surface group $G=\langle a_1,\dots, a_n\mid a_1^2\cdots a_n^2=1\rangle$, where $n\ge 1$.

== Generalizations and open problems ==
- If A and B are two groups, and $r\in A\ast B$ is an element in their free product, one can consider a one-relator product $G=A\ast B/\langle\langle r\rangle\rangle=\langle A, B\mid r=1\rangle$.
- The so-called Kervaire conjecture, also known as Kervaire–Laudenbach conjecture, asks if it is true that if A is a nontrivial group and $B=\langle t\rangle$ is infinite cyclic then for every $r\in A\ast B$ the one-relator product $G=\langle A, t\mid r=1\rangle$ is nontrivial.
- Klyachko proved the Kervaire conjecture for the case where A is torsion-free.
- A conjecture attributed to Gersten says that a finitely generated one-relator group is word-hyperbolic if and only if it contains no Baumslag–Solitar subgroups.

== See also ==
- 3-manifolds
- Geometric topology
- Small cancellation theory

== Sources ==
- Wilhelm Magnus, Abraham Karrass, Donald Solitar, Combinatorial group theory. Presentations of groups in terms of generators and relations, Reprint of the 1976 second edition, Dover Publications, Inc., Mineola, NY, 2004. ISBN 0-486-43830-9. MR 2109550
- Lyndon, Roger C.; Schupp, Paul E. (2001). Combinatorial group theory. Classics in Mathematics. Springer-Verlag, Berlin. ISBN 3-540-41158-5. MR 1812024.
