= Donald Solitar =

Donald Solitar (September 5, 1932 in Brooklyn, New York, United States – April 28, 2008 in Toronto, Canada) was an American and Canadian mathematician, known for his work in combinatorial group theory. The Baumslag–Solitar groups are named after him and Gilbert Baumslag, after their joint 1962 paper on these groups.

== Life ==
Solitar competed on the mathematics team of Brooklyn Technical High School with his future co-author Abe Karrass, one year ahead of him in school. He graduated from Brooklyn College in 1953 (with the assistance of tutoring from Karrass, who went to New York University) and went to Princeton University for graduate study in mathematics. However, his intended mentor there, Emil Artin, was no longer interested in group theory, so he left with a master's degree and earned his doctorate from New York University instead, in 1958, under the supervision of Wilhelm Magnus.

After finishing his studies, he joined the faculty of Adelphi University in 1959, and Karrass soon joined him there as a doctoral student, earning a Ph.D. under Solitar's supervision in 1961; this was the first Ph.D. awarded at Adelphi. Karrass remained on the faculty with Solitar, where they founded a summer institute for high school mathematics teachers. Solitar moved to Polytechnic University in 1967, and then (as department chair) to York University in 1968, along with Karrass.

Solitar married J. Francien Hageman, a Dutch woman, in 1976. He died of a heart attack on April 28, 2008.

== Selected publications ==
Books

- Magnus, Wilhelm; Karrass, Abraham; Solitar, Donald (1966), Combinatorial group theory: Presentations of groups in terms of generators and relations, Interscience Publishers [John Wiley & Sons, Inc.], New York-London-Sydney, MR 0207802.

Research articles

- Baumslag, Gilbert; Solitar, Donald (1962), "Some two-generator one-relator non-Hopfian groups", Bulletin of the American Mathematical Society, 68 (3): 199–201, doi:10.1090/s0002-9904-1962-10745-9, MR 0142635.
- Karrass, A.; Solitar, D. (1970), "The subgroups of a free product of two groups with an amalgamated subgroup", Transactions of the American Mathematical Society, 150 (1): 227–255, doi:10.2307/1995492, JSTOR 1995492, MR 0260879.
- Karrass, A.; Pietrowski, A.; Solitar, D. (1973), "Finite and infinite cyclic extensions of free groups", Journal of the Australian Mathematical Society, 16 (4): 458–466, doi:10.1017/s1446788700015445, MR 0349850.

== Awards and honors ==
Solitar became a Fellow of the Royal Society of Canada in 1982.
