= Baumslag group =

Baumslag group can refer to:

- Baumslag–Gersten group
- Baumslag–Solitar group
