= Non-Archimedean geometry =

Geometry where the axiom of Archimedes is negated

In mathematics, non-Archimedean geometry is any of a number of forms of geometry in which the axiom of Archimedes is negated. An example of such a geometry is the Dehn plane. Non-Archimedean geometries may, as the example indicates, have properties significantly different from Euclidean geometry.

There are two senses in which the term may be used, referring to geometries over fields which violate one of the two senses of the Archimedean property (i.e. with respect to order or magnitude).

== Geometry over a non-Archimedean ordered field ==
The first sense of the term is the geometry over a non-Archimedean ordered field, or a subset thereof. The aforementioned Dehn plane takes the self-product of the finite portion of a certain non-Archimedean ordered field based on the field of rational functions. In this geometry, there are significant differences from Euclidean geometry; in particular, there are infinitely many parallels to a straight line through a point—so the parallel postulate fails—but the sum of the angles of a triangle is still a straight angle.

Intuitively, in such a space, the points on a line cannot be described by the real numbers or a subset thereof, and there exist segments of "infinite" or "infinitesimal" length.

== Geometry over a non-Archimedean valued field ==
The second sense of the term is the metric geometry over a non-Archimedean valued field, or ultrametric space. In such a space, even more contradictions to Euclidean geometry result. For example, all triangles are isosceles, and overlapping balls nest. An example of such a space is the p-adic numbers.

Intuitively, in such a space, distances fail to "add up" or "accumulate".
