= Delaram Kahrobaei =

Iranian-American mathematician

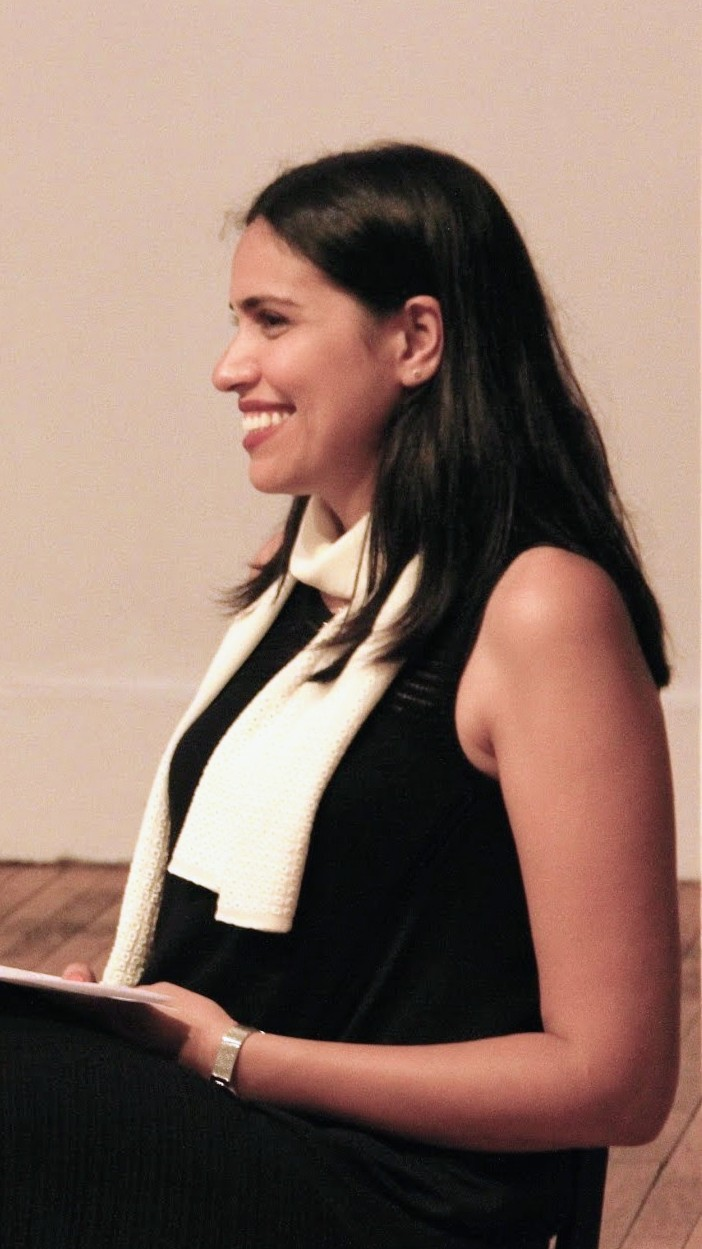
- Education: Sharif University of Technology City College of New York Claremont Graduate University CUNY Graduate Center
- Scientific career
- Fields: Mathematics Computer Science Cryptography
- Institutions: New York University; CUNY Graduate Center; Queens College, City University of New York; City University of New York; University of York; University of St. Andrews
- Thesis: Residual Solvability of Generalized Free Products (2004)
- Doctoral advisor: Gilbert Baumslag
- Website: https://sites.google.com/a/nyu.edu/delaram-kahrobaei

Delaram Kahrobaei is an Iranian-American mathematician and computer scientist. She is a full professor at Queens College, City University of New York (CUNY), with appointments in the Departments of Computer Science and Mathematics. Her research focuses on post-quantum cryptography, and the applied algebra.

== Education ==
Delaram Kahrobaei obtained her undergraduate degree in Mathematics from Sharif University of Technology in 1998. She earned a Master of Science in Mathematics from Claremont Graduate University and a Master of Arts in Computer Science from The City College of New York. In 2004, she completed her Ph.D. in Mathematics at the CUNY Graduate Center under the supervision of Gilbert Baumslag. Her doctoral thesis was on the residual solvability of generalized free products.

== Academic career ==
Delaram Kahrobaei became an Assistant Professor in Pure Mathematics at the School of Mathematics and Statistics at the University of St. Andrews in 2004. From 2006 she was faculty of Mathematics at City University of New York until 2018 that she joined the University of York, where she was the Chair of Cyber Security in the Department of Computer Science and served as the founding director of the York Interdisciplinary Centre for Cyber Security until 2021. She is visiting honorary professor of computer science at University of York since 2021. She is also Adjunct Professor of computer science and engineering at New York University Tandon School of Engineering

She has held visiting professor positions at Institut des Hautes Études Scientifiques (IHES), Institut Henri Poincaré (IHP), Sorbonne Université, University of Geneva, Polytechnic University of Catalonia, University of Salerno, University of Toronto, École Polytechnique Fédérale de Lausanne (EPFL).

Kahrobaei is an active member of various international networks focused on cybersecurity and responsible data science. She is involved with the Initiative for the Theoretical Sciences at CUNY, serves on the Friends of IHES Board of Directors, and is a member of the Quantum Security via Algebras and Representation Theory (QUASAR) project based at the University of Ottawa. She co-founded and served as President of the university start-up Infoshield, Inc. She has been a scientific board member for several organizations, including NodeQ (a US-UK based quantum start-up), and LifeNome Inc., a biotech company.

== Scientific contributions ==
=== Books ===
- Applications of Group Theory in Cryptography: Post-quantum Group-based Cryptography. American Mathematical Society. 2024. ISBN 978-1-4704-7469-0.
- Artificial Intelligence in Health care and Medicine. CRC Press, Taylor and Francis. 2022. ISBN 978-0367638405.
- Algebra and Computer Science. American Mathematical Society, Contemporary Mathematics. 2016. ISBN 978-1-4704-2303-2.

=== Publications ===
- Flores, R.; Kahrobaei, D.; Koberda, T. (2021). "Hamiltonicity via cohomology of right-angled Artin groups". Linear Algebra and Its Applications. 631: 94–110. arXiv:2101.10155. doi:10.1016/j.laa.2021.08.019.
- Flores, R.; Kahrobaei, D.; Koberda, T. (2021). "An algebraic characterization of $k$–colorability". Proceedings of the American Mathematical Society. 149 (5): 2249–2255. arXiv:2003.01484. doi:10.1090/proc/15391.
- Di Crescenzo, G.; Khodjaeva, M.; Kahrobaei, D.; Shpilrain, V. (2020). "Secure and Efficient Delegation of Elliptic-Curve Pairing". Applied Cryptography and Network Security. Lecture Notes in Computer Science. Vol. 12146. pp. 45–66. doi:10.1007/978-3-030-57808-4_3. ISBN 978-3-030-57807-7.
- Flores, R.; Kahrobaei, D.; Koberda, T. (2019). "Algorithmic Problems in right-angled Artin groups: Complexity and Applications". Journal of Algebra. 519: 111–129. arXiv:1802.04870. doi:10.1016/j.jalgebra.2018.10.023.
- Wood, A.; Shpilrain, V.; Najarian, K.; Kahrobaei, D. (2019). "Private Naive Bayes Classification of Personal Biomedical Data: Application in Cancer Data Analysis". Computers in Biology and Medicine. 105: 144–150. doi:10.1016/j.compbiomed.2018.11.018. PMID 30641309.
- Gryak, J.; Kahrobaei, D.; Martinez-Perez, C. (2019). "On the conjugacy problem in certain metabelian groups". Glasgow Mathematical Journal. 61 (2): 251–269. arXiv:1610.06503. doi:10.1017/S0017089518000198.
- Gribov, A.; Kahrobaei, D.; Shpilrain, V. (2018). "Practical Private-key Fully Homomorphic Encryption in Rings". Groups Complexity Cryptology. 10 (1): 17–27. doi:10.1515/gcc-2018-0006.
- Kahrobaei, D.; Shpilrain, V. (2016). "Invited Paper: Using semidirect product of (semi)groups in public key cryptography". Computability in Europe 2016. Lecture Notes in Computer Science. Vol. 9709. pp. 132–141. arXiv:1604.05542.
- Habeeb, M.; Kahrobaei, D.; Koupparis, C.; Shpilrain, V. (2013). "Public key exchange using semidirect product of (semi)groups". ACNS 2013, Applied Cryptography and Network Security. Lecture Notes Computer Science. Vol. 7954. pp. 475–486. arXiv:1304.6572.
- Gryak, J.; Haralick, R.; Kahrobaei, D. (2020). "Solving the Conjugacy Decision Problem via Machine Learning". Experimental Mathematics. 29 (1): 66–78. arXiv:1705.10417. doi:10.1080/10586458.2018.1434704.
- Bettale, L.; Kahrobaei, D.; Perret, L.; Verbel, J. (2024). "Biscuit: New MPCitH Signature Scheme from Structured Multivariate Polynomials". Applied Cryptography and Network Security. Lecture Notes in Computer Science. Vol. 14583. Springer, Cham. pp. 457–486. doi:10.1007/978-3-031-54770-6_18. ISBN 978-3-031-54769-0.
- Battarbee, C.; Kahrobaei, D.; Perret, L.; Shahandashti, S. F. (2024). "A Subexponential Quantum Algorithm for the Semidirect Discrete Logarithm Problem". Post-Quantum Cryptography. Lecture Notes in Computer Science. Vol. 14771. Springer. pp. 202–226. doi:10.1007/978-3-031-62743-9_7. ISBN 978-3-031-62742-2.
- Flores, R.; Kahrobaei, D.; Koberda, T. (2024). "Expanders and right-angled Artin groups". Journal of Topology and Analysis. 16 (2). World Scientific: 155–179. arXiv:2005.06143. doi:10.1142/S179352532150059X. hdl:11441/134839.
- Flores, R.; Kahrobaei, D.; Koberda, T.; Le Coz, C. (2024). "Right-angled Artin groups and the cohomology basis graph". Proceedings of the Edinburgh Mathematical Society. Cambridge University Press: 1–17. arXiv:2309.05495.
- Battarbee, C.; Kahrobaei, D.; Perret, L.; Shahandashti, S. F. (2023). "SPDH-Sign: towards Efficient, Post-quantum Group-based Signature". PQCrypto 2023, 14th International Conference on Post-Quantum Cryptography. Lecture Notes in Computer Science. Vol. 14154. pp. 113–138. doi:10.1007/978-3-031-40003-2_5. ISBN 978-3-031-40002-5.
- Kahrobaei, D.; Stanojkovski, M. (2023). "Cryptographic multilinear maps using pro-p groups". Advances in Mathematics of Communications. 17 (5). American Institute of Mathematics: 1101–1114. arXiv:2102.04513. doi:10.3934/amc.2021041.

=== Editorial Roles ===
- Associate Editor: Advances in Mathematics of Communication, American Institute of Mathematical Sciences
- Chief Editor: International Journal of Computer Mathematics: Computer Systems Theory, Taylor & Francis
- Associate Editor: SIAM Journal on Applied Algebra and Geometry, The Society for Industrial and Applied Mathematics
- Associate Editor: Journal of Mathematical Cryptology, De Gruyter
- Associate Editor: La Matematica Official Journal of the Association for Women in Mathematics, Springer Nature Group
