= Absolute presentation of a group =

In mathematics, an absolute presentation is one method of defining a group.

Recall that to define a group $G$ by means of a presentation, one specifies a set $S$ of generators so that every element of the group can be written as a product of some of these generators, and a set $R$ of relations among those generators. In symbols:

$$G \simeq \langle S \mid R \rangle.$$

Informally $G$ is the group generated by the set $S$ such that $r = 1$ for all $r \in R$. But here there is a tacit assumption that $G$ is the "freest" such group as clearly the relations are satisfied in any homomorphic image of $G$. One way of being able to eliminate this tacit assumption is by specifying that certain words in $S$ should not be equal to $1.$ That is, we specify a set $I$, called the set of irrelations, such that $i \ne 1$ for all $i \in I.$

== Formal definition ==
To define an absolute presentation of a group $G$ one specifies a set $S$ of generators and sets $R$ and $I$ of relations and irrelations among those generators. We then say $G$ has absolute presentation

$$\langle S \mid R, I\rangle$$

provided that:

1. $G$ has presentation $\langle S \mid R\rangle.$
2. Given any homomorphism $h:G\rightarrow H$ such that the irrelations $I$ are satisfied in $h(G)$, $G$ is isomorphic to $h(G)$.

A more algebraic, but equivalent, way of stating condition 2 is:

2a. If $N\triangleleft G$ is a non-trivial normal subgroup of $G$ then $I\cap N\neq \left\{ 1\right\} .$

Remark: The concept of an absolute presentation has been fruitful in fields such as algebraically closed groups and the Grigorchuk topology. In the literature, in a context where absolute presentations are being discussed, a presentation (in the usual sense of the word) is sometimes referred to as a relative presentation, which is an instance of a retronym.

== Example ==
The cyclic group of order 8 has the presentation

$$\langle a \mid a^8 = 1\rangle.$$

But, up to isomorphism there are three more groups that "satisfy" the relation $a^8 = 1,$ namely:

$$\langle a \mid a^4 = 1\rangle$$
$\langle a \mid a^2 = 1\rangle$ and
$$\langle a \mid a = 1\rangle.$$

However, none of these satisfy the irrelation $a^4 \neq 1$. So an absolute presentation for the cyclic group of order 8 is:

$$\langle a \mid a^8 = 1, a^4 \neq 1\rangle.$$

It is part of the definition of an absolute presentation that the irrelations are not satisfied in any proper homomorphic image of the group. Therefore:

$$\langle a \mid a^8 = 1, a^2 \neq 1\rangle$$

Is not an absolute presentation for the cyclic group of order 8 because the irrelation $a^2 \neq 1$ is satisfied in the cyclic group of order 4.

== Background ==
The notion of an absolute presentation arises from Bernhard Neumann's study of the isomorphism problem for algebraically closed groups.

A common strategy for considering whether two groups $G$ and $H$ are isomorphic is to consider whether a presentation for one might be transformed into a presentation for the other. However algebraically closed groups are neither finitely generated nor recursively presented and so it is impossible to compare their presentations. Neumann considered the following alternative strategy:

Suppose we know that a group $G$ with finite presentation $G=\langle x_1,x_2 \mid R \rangle$ can be embedded in the algebraically closed group $G^{*}$ then given another algebraically closed group $H^{*}$, we can ask "Can $G$ be embedded in $H^{*}$?"

It soon becomes apparent that a presentation for a group does not contain enough information to make this decision for while there may be a homomorphism $h:G\rightarrow H^{*}$, this homomorphism need not be an embedding. What is needed is a specification for $G^{*}$ that "forces" any homomorphism preserving that specification to be an embedding. An absolute presentation does precisely this.

== See also ==
- Presentation of a group
