= Stephen M. Gersten =

American mathematician (born 1940)

Stephen M. Gersten (born 2 December 1940) is an American mathematician, specializing in finitely presented groups and their geometric properties.

Gersten graduated in 1961 with an AB from Princeton University and in 1965 with a PhD from Trinity College, Cambridge. His doctoral thesis was Class Groups of Supplemented Algebras written under the supervision of John R. Stallings. In the late 1960s and early 1970s he taught at Rice University. In 1972–1973 he was a visiting scholar at the Institute for Advanced Study. In 1973 he became a professor at the University of Illinois at Urbana–Champaign. In 1974 he was an Invited Speaker at the International Congress of Mathematicians in Vancouver. At the University of Utah he became a professor in 1975 and is now semi-retired there. His PhD students include Roger C. Alperin, R. Keith Dennis and Edward W. Formanek.

Gersten's conjecture has motivated considerable research.

== Gersten's theorem ==
If φ is an automorphism of a finitely generated free group F then { x : x ∈ F and φ(x) $=$ x } is finitely generated.

== Selected publications ==
- Gersten, S. M. (1972). "On the spectrum of algebraic $K$-theory". Bulletin of the American Mathematical Society. 78 (2): 216–220. doi:10.1090/S0002-9904-1972-12924-0.
- Gersten, S. M. (1973). "Higher $K$-theory for regular schemes". Bulletin of the American Mathematical Society. 79: 193–197. doi:10.1090/S0002-9904-1973-13150-7.
- Gersten, S. M. (1973). "Higher K-theory of rings". Higher K-Theories. Lecture Notes in Mathematics. Vol. 341. pp. 3–42. doi:10.1007/BFb0067049. ISBN 978-3-540-06434-3.
- Brown, Kenneth S.; Gersten, Stephen M. (1973). "Algebraic K-theory as generalized sheaf cohomology". Higher K-Theories. Lecture Notes in Mathematics. Vol. 341. pp. 266–292. doi:10.1007/BFb0067062. ISBN 978-3-540-06434-3.
- Gersten, S. M. (1983). "A short proof of the algebraic Weierstrass preparation theorem". Proceedings of the American Mathematical Society. 88 (4): 751–752. doi:10.1090/S0002-9939-1983-0702313-2. (See Weierstrass preparation theorem.)
- Gersten, S. M. (1983). "On fixed points of automorphisms of finitely generated free groups". Bulletin of the American Mathematical Society. 8 (3): 451–455. doi:10.1090/S0273-0979-1983-15116-9. (This paper presents a proof of a conjecture made by G. Peter Scott.)
- Gersten, S. M. (1984). "On Whitehead's algorithm". Bulletin of the American Mathematical Society. 10 (2): 281–285. doi:10.1090/S0273-0979-1984-15246-7.
- Gersten, S. M. (1987). "Reducible Diagrams and Equations over Groups". Essays in Group Theory. Mathematical Sciences Research Institute Publications. Vol. 8. pp. 15–73. doi:10.1007/978-1-4613-9586-7_2. ISBN 978-1-4613-9588-1.
- Gersten, S. M.; Short, Hamish B. (1990). "Small cancellation theory and automatic groups". Inventiones Mathematicae. 102: 305–334. Bibcode:1990InMat.102..305G. doi:10.1007/BF01233430. S2CID 120267906.
- Baumslag, Gilbert; Gersten, S.M.; Shapiro, Michael; Short, H. (1991). "Automatic groups and amalgams". Journal of Pure and Applied Algebra. 76 (3): 229–316. doi:10.1016/0022-4049(91)90139-S.
- Gersten, S. M.; Short, H. B. (1991). "Rational Subgroups of Biautomatic Groups". Annals of Mathematics. 134 (1): 125–158. doi:10.2307/2944334. JSTOR 2944334.
- Gersten, S. M. (1992). "Dehn Functions and l_{1}-norms of Finite Presentations". In Baumslag G.; Miller C.F. (eds.). Algorithms and Classification in Combinatorial Group Theory. Mathematical Sciences Research Institute Publications. Vol. 23. New York: Springer. pp. 195–224. doi:10.1007/978-1-4613-9730-4_9. ISBN 978-1-4613-9732-8. ISSN 0940-4740.
- Gersten, S.M. (1993). "Isoperimetric and isodiametric functions of finite presentations". Geometric group theory. Vol. 1. Cambridge University Press. pp. 79–96. ISBN 9780521435291.

== See also ==
- Baumslag–Gersten group
