= Freiheitssatz =

Result in the presentation theory of mathematical groups

In mathematics, the Freiheitssatz (German: "freedom/independence theorem": Freiheit + Satz) is a result in the presentation theory of groups, stating that certain subgroups of a one-relator group are free groups.

== Statement ==
Consider a group presentation

$$G = \langle x_{1}, \dots, x_{n} | r = 1 \rangle$$

given by n generators x_{i} and a single cyclically reduced relator r. If x_{1} appears in r, then (according to the freiheitssatz) the subgroup of G generated by x_{2}, ..., x_{n} is a free group, freely generated by x_{2}, ..., x_{n}. In other words, the only relations involving x_{2}, ..., x_{n} are the trivial ones.

== History ==
The result was proposed by the German mathematician Max Dehn and proved by his student, Wilhelm Magnus, in his doctoral thesis. Although Dehn expected Magnus to find a topological proof, Magnus instead found a proof based on mathematical induction and amalgamated products of groups. Different induction-based proofs were given later by Lyndon (1972) and Weinbaum (1972).

== Significance ==
The Freiheitssatz has become "the cornerstone of one-relator group theory", and motivated the development of the theory of amalgamated products. It also provides an analogue, in non-commutative group theory, of certain results on vector spaces and other commutative groups.
