= Subgroup distortion =

Concept in geometric group theory

In geometric group theory, a discipline of mathematics, subgroup distortion measures the extent to which an overgroup can reduce the complexity of a group's word problem. Like much of geometric group theory, the concept is due to Misha Gromov, who introduced it in 1993.

Formally, let S generate group H, and let G be an overgroup for H generated by S ∪ T. Then each generating set defines a word metric on the corresponding group; the distortion of H in G is the asymptotic equivalence class of the function
$$R\mapsto\frac{\operatorname{diam}_H(B_G(0,R)\cap H)}{\operatorname{diam}_H(B_H(0,R))}\text{,}$$
where B_{X}(x, r) is the ball of radius r about center x in X and diam(S) is the diameter of S.

A subgroup with bounded distortion is called undistorted, and is the same thing as a quasi-isometrically embedded subgroup.

== Examples ==
For example, consider the infinite cyclic group ℤ = ⟨b⟩, embedded as a normal subgroup of the Baumslag–Solitar group BS(1, 2) = ⟨a, b⟩. With respect to the chosen generating sets, the element
$$b^{2^n}=a^nba^{-n}$$
is distance 2^{n} from the origin in ℤ, but distance 2n + 1 from the origin in BS(1, 2). In particular, ℤ is at least exponentially distorted with base 2.

On the other hand, any embedded copy of ℤ in the free abelian group on two generators ℤ^{2} is undistorted, as is any embedding of ℤ into itself.

== Elementary properties ==
In a tower of groups K ≤ H ≤ G, the distortion of K in G is at least the distortion of K in H.

A normal abelian subgroup has distortion determined by the eigenvalues of the conjugation overgroup representation; formally, if g ∈ G acts on V ≤ G with eigenvalue λ, then V is at least exponentially distorted with base λ. For many non-normal but still abelian subgroups, the distortion of the normal core gives a strong lower bound.

== Known values ==
Every computable function with at most exponential growth can be a subgroup distortion, but Lie subgroups of a nilpotent Lie group always have distortion n ↦ n^{r} for some rational r.

The denominator in the definition is always 2R; for this reason, it is often omitted. In that case, a subgroup that is not locally finite has superadditive distortion; conversely every superadditive function (up to asymptotic equivalence) can be found this way.

== In cryptography ==
The simplification in a word problem induced by subgroup distortion suffices to construct a cryptosystem, algorithms for encoding and decoding secret messages. Formally, the plaintext message is any object (such as text, images, or numbers) that can be encoded as a number n. The transmitter then encodes n as an element g ∈ H with word length n. In a public overgroup G with that distorts H, the element g has a word of much smaller length, which is then transmitted to the receiver along with a number of "decoys" from G \ H, to obscure the secret subgroup H. The receiver then picks out the element of H, re-expresses the word in terms of generators of H, and recovers n.
