= Max Dehn =

German-American mathematician (1878–1952)

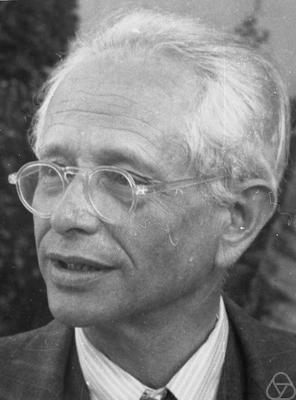
- Born: November 13, 1878; Hamburg, German Empire
- Died: June 27, 1952 (aged 73); Black Mountain, North Carolina
- Education: University of Göttingen
- Known for: Dehn invariant Dehn's algorithm Dehn surgery Dehn's lemma Dehn twist Dehn function Dehn plane Dehn's rigidity theorem Dehn-Sommerville equations Dehn-Nielsen theorem
- Scientific career
- Fields: Mathematics
- Workplaces: University of Münster; Goethe University Frankfurt; Black Mountain College
- Doctoral advisor: David Hilbert
- Doctoral students: Ott-Heinrich Keller; Wilhelm Magnus; Ruth Moufang

Max Wilhelm Dehn (November 13, 1878 – June 27, 1952) was a German mathematician most famous for his work in geometry, topology and geometric group theory. Dehn's early life and career took place in Germany. However, he was forced to retire in 1935 and eventually fled Germany in 1939 and emigrated to the United States.

Dehn was a student of David Hilbert, and in his habilitation in 1900 Dehn resolved Hilbert's third problem, making him the first to resolve one of Hilbert's 23 problems. Dehn's doctoral students include Ott-Heinrich Keller, Ruth Moufang, and Wilhelm Magnus; he also mentored mathematician Peter Nemenyi and the artists Dorothea Rockburne and Ruth Asawa.

== Biography ==
Dehn was born to a family of Jewish origin in Hamburg, Imperial Germany.

He studied the foundations of geometry with Hilbert at Göttingen in 1899, and obtained a proof of the Jordan curve theorem for polygons. In 1900 he wrote his dissertation on the role of the Legendre angle sum theorem in axiomatic geometry, constructing the Dehn planes as counterexamples to the theorem in geometries without the Archimedean axiom. From 1900 to 1911 he was an employee and researcher at the University of Münster. In his habilitation at the University of Münster in 1900 he resolved Hilbert's third problem, by introducing what was afterwards called the Dehn invariant. This was the first resolution of one of the Hilbert Problems.

Dehn's interests later turned to topology and combinatorial group theory. In 1907 he wrote with Poul Heegaard the first book on the foundations of combinatorial topology, then known as analysis situs. Also in 1907, he described the construction of a new homology sphere. In 1908 he believed that he had found a proof of the Poincaré conjecture, but Tietze found an error.

In 1910 Dehn published a paper on three-dimensional topology in which he introduced Dehn surgery and used it to construct homology spheres. He also stated Dehn's lemma, but an error was found in his proof by Hellmuth Kneser in 1929. The result was proved in 1957 by Christos Papakyriakopoulos. The word problem for groups, also called the Dehn problem, was posed by him in 1911.

Dehn married Antonie Landau on August 23, 1912. Also in 1912, Dehn invented what is now known as Dehn's algorithm and used it in his work on the word and conjugacy problems for groups. The notion of a Dehn function in geometric group theory, which estimates the area of a relation in a finitely presented group in terms of the length of that relation, is also named after him. In 1914 he proved that the left and right trefoil knots are not equivalent. In the early 1920s Dehn introduced the result that would come to be known as the Dehn-Nielsen theorem; its proof would be published in 1927 by Jakob Nielsen.

In 1922 Dehn succeeded Ludwig Bieberbach at Frankfurt, where he stayed until he was forced to retire in 1935. During this time he taught a seminar on historical works of mathematics. The seminar attracted prolific mathematicians Carl Ludwig Siegel and André Weil, and Weil considered Dehn's seminar to be his most important contribution to mathematics. As an example of its influence, the seminar has been credited for inspiring Siegel's discovery of the Riemann–Siegel formula among Riemann's unpublished notes.

Dehn stayed in Germany until January 1939, when he fled to Copenhagen, and then to Trondheim, Norway, where he took a position at the Norwegian Institute of Technology. In October 1940 he left Norway for America by way of Siberia and Japan (the Atlantic crossing was considered too dangerous).

In America, Dehn obtained a position at Idaho Southern University (now Idaho State University). In 1942 he took a job at the Illinois Institute of Technology, and in 1943 he moved to St. John's College in Annapolis, Maryland. Finally in 1945, he moved to the experimental arts college, Black Mountain College, where he was the only mathematician.

He died in Black Mountain, North Carolina in 1952.

== Black Mountain College ==
In March 1944, Dehn was invited to give two talks at Black Mountain College on the philosophy and history of mathematics. He noted in a letter that a lecture on an advanced mathematical topic didn't seem appropriate given the audience. He instead offered up the lectures "Common roots of mathematics and ornamentics," and "Some moments in the development of mathematical ideas." Black Mountain College faculty contacted him shortly after concerning a full-time position. After negotiating his salary from $25 to $40 per month, Dehn and his wife moved into housing provided by the school and he began teaching in January 1945.

While at Black Mountain College, Dehn taught courses in Mathematics, Philosophy, Greek, and Italian. In his class "Geometry for Artists," Dehn introduced students to geometric concepts such as points, lines, planes and solids; cones sectioned into circles, ellipses, parabolas, and hyperbolas; spheres and regular polyhedrons. His classes had an emphasis on the way shapes relate to each other, a concept that can be useful in artistic mediums.

He enjoyed the forested mountains found in Black Mountain, and would often hold class in the woods, giving lectures during hikes. His lectures frequently drifted off topic on tangents about philosophy, the arts, and nature and their connection to mathematics. He and his wife took part in community meetings and often ate in the dining room. They also regularly had long breakfasts with Buckminster Fuller and his wife.

In the summer of 1952 Dehn was made Professor Emeritus, which allowed him to remain on campus and act as an advisor. Unfortunately he died of an embolism shortly after witnessing the removal of several dogwood trees from the campus. He is buried in the woods on the campus.

== See also ==
A wide variety of concepts have been named for Dehn. Among them:

- Dehn's rigidity theorem
- Dehn invariant
- Dehn's algorithm
- Dehn's lemma
- Dehn plane
- Dehn surgery
- Dehn twist
- Dehn–Sommerville equations

Other topics of interest

- Chiral knot
- Conjugacy problem
- Freiheitssatz
- Group isomorphism problem
- Lotschnittaxiom
- Mapping class group of a surface
- Non-Archimedean ordered field
- Scissors congruence
- Two ears theorem
- Undecidable problem
