= Primitive element =

In mathematics, the term primitive element can mean:

- Primitive root modulo n, in number theory
- Primitive element (field theory), an element that generates a given field extension
- Primitive element (finite field), an element that generates the multiplicative group of a finite field
- Primitive element (lattice), an element in a lattice that is not a positive integer multiple of another element in the lattice
- Primitive element (coalgebra), an element X on which the comultiplication Δ has the value Δ(X) = X⊗1 + 1⊗X
- Primitive element (free group), an element of a free generating set
- Primitive element (Lie algebra), a Borel-weight vector

== See also ==
- Primitive element theorem
- Primitive root (disambiguation)
