= David E. Muller =

American mathematician (1924–2008)

- Born: November 2, 1924; Austin
- Died: April 27, 2008 (aged 83); Las Cruces, New Mexico
- Occupation(s): mathematician, computer scientist
- Known for: Muller's method; Muller C-element; Reed–Muller codes; Muller automata; Muller–Schupp theorem

David Eugene Muller (November 2, 1924 – April 27, 2008) was an American mathematician and computer scientist. He was a professor of mathematics and computer science at the University of Illinois (1953–92), after which he became an emeritus professor, and was an adjunct professor of mathematics at the New Mexico State University (1995–2008). Muller received his BS in 1947 and his PhD in 1951 in physics from Caltech; an honorary PhD was conferred by the University of Paris in 1989. He was the inventor of the Muller C-element (or Muller C-gate), a device used to implement asynchronous circuitry in digital computers. He also co-invented the Reed–Muller codes. He discovered the codes, and Irving S. Reed proposed the majority logic decoding for the first time. Furthermore, he invented Muller automata, an automaton model for infinite words. In geometric group theory Muller is known for the Muller–Schupp theorem, joint with Paul Schupp, characterizing finitely generated virtually free groups as finitely generated groups with context-free word problem.

== Family ==
David E. Muller was the son of Hermann Joseph Muller and Jessie Jacobs Muller Offermann (formerly Jesse Marie Jacobs). He was born in Austin, Texas, when his parents taught at The University of Texas. His mother was one of the first women to receive a Ph.D. in mathematics in the United States, and he credited her with inspiring his early interest in mathematics. She lost her position as an instructor in pure mathematics at Texas because she became pregnant, and according to Hermann Joseph Muller's biographer, "her colleagues felt that a mother could not give full attention to classroom duties and remain a good mother." As a child he was with his parents in Berlin and Leningrad in 1933–34. His family was dissolved in the Soviet Union. He returned to Austin with his mother in July 1934. His mother obtained a divorce in Texas in the summer of 1935. Sometime between October 1935 and January 1936, Jessie Muller married Carlos Alberto Offermann, who had been working in Muller's laboratory and was on a visit to Austin from the Soviet Union at that time. Hermann Joseph Muller left the Soviet Union in 1937 after the start of Stalin's political persecutions. After a brief stay in Madrid and Paris, in September 1937, Hermann moved to Edinburgh, where he married Dorothea Kantorowicz in May 1939. They had a daughter, Helen Juliette. Hermann Joseph Muller received the Nobel Prize in Physiology or Medicine in 1946.

David E. Muller died in 2008 in Las Cruces, New Mexico. He is survived by his children, Chandra L. Muller and Kenneth J. Muller. His half-sister, Helen J. Muller, is a professor emerita at the University of New Mexico. He was predeceased by his wife Alice Mimi Muller, who died in Urbana, Illinois, in 1989, and divorced (posthumously) in 2009 from his second wife, Denise Impens Muller, in Las Cruces, New Mexico.

== See also ==
- Muller C-element
- Reed–Muller code
- Reed–Muller expansion
- Muller's method (an established root finding method in numerical analysis)
- Muller automaton
