= Wilhelm Magnus =

German-American mathematician

Hans Heinrich Wilhelm Magnus, known as Wilhelm Magnus (5 February 1907 in Berlin, Germany – 15 October 1990 in New Rochelle, New York), was a German-American mathematician. He made important contributions in combinatorial group theory, Lie algebras, mathematical physics, elliptic functions, and the study of tessellations.

== Biography ==
In 1931, Magnus received his PhD from the University of Frankfurt in Germany. His thesis, written under the direction of Max Dehn, was entitled Über unendlich diskontinuierliche Gruppen von einer definierenden Relation (der Freiheitssatz).

Magnus was a faculty member in Frankfurt from 1933 until 1938. He refused to join the Nazi Party and, as a consequence, was not allowed to hold an academic post during World War II. In 1947, he became a professor at the University of Göttingen.

In 1948, he emigrated to the United States to collaborate on the Bateman Manuscript Project as a co-editor while a visiting professor at the California Institute of Technology. In 1950, he was appointed professor at the Courant Institute of Mathematical Sciences in New York University. He stayed there until 1973, when he moved to the Polytechnic Institute of New York, before retiring in 1978. His doctoral students include Joan Birman, Martin Greendlinger, Edna Grossman, Herbert Keller, Seymour Lipschutz, and Kathryn F. Kuiken.

== See also ==
- Magnus expansion
- Magnus–Moldavansky method
- Commutator collecting process
- Free Lie algebra
- Hall word

== Selected works ==
- with Gilbert Baumslag and Bruce Chandler, eds.: Wilhelm Magnus, Collected Papers. Springer-Verlag, 1984.
- Noneuclidean tessellations and their groups. Academic Press, 1974.
- with Bruce Chandler: The History of Combinatorial Group Theory. A Case Study in the History of Ideas. Springer, 1982.
- Wilhelm Magnus, Abraham Karrass, Donald Solitar, Combinatorial Group Theory. Presentations of Groups in Terms of Generators and Relations, reprint of the 1976 second edition, Dover Publications, Mineola, NY, 2004. ISBN 0-486-43830-9
- Wilhelm Magnus, Stanley Winkler, Hill's Equation, reprint of the 1979 second edition, Dover Publications, Mineola, NY, 2004. ISBN 0-486-49565-5.
- with Israel Grossman: Groups and Their Graphs. Random House (New Mathematical Library 14), 1965.
- Erdélyi, Arthur; Magnus, Wilhelm; Oberhettinger, Fritz [in German]; Tricomi, Francesco G. (1955), Higher Transcendental Functions. Vols. I-III, McGraw-Hill (The Bateman Manuscript Project: scan)
- Wilhelm Magnus, Fritz Oberhettinger, and Raz Pal Soni, Formulas and Theorems for the Special Functions of Mathematical Physics. Springer-Verlag New York, New York, 1966.
- with Fritz Oberhettinger: Formeln und Sätze für die speziellen Funktionen der mathematischen Physik. Springer 1943; 2nd edition, 1948; 3rd edition in English, Formulas and Theorems for the Functions of Mathematical Physics, Chelsea, 1966.
- with Fritz Oberhettinger: Anwendungen der elliptischen Funktionen in Physik und Technik. Springer 1949.
