= Primitive root =

In mathematics, a primitive root may mean:

- Primitive root modulo n in modular arithmetic
- Primitive nth root of unity amongst the solutions of z^{n} = 1 in a field

== See also ==
- Primitive element (disambiguation)
