= Roger C. Alperin =

American mathematician (1947–2019)

Roger Charles Alperin (January 8, 1947 – November 21, 2019) was an American mathematician, best known for his work in group theory, including its connections with geometry and topology. He was a professor at the University of Oklahoma and at San Jose State University.

== Education and career ==
Alperin was born on January 8, 1947, in Cambridge, Massachusetts. He received a bachelor's degree from the University of Chicago, and his PhD from Rice University in 1973. His thesis was supervised by Stephen M. Gersten, and was titled Whitehead Torsion of Finite Abelian Groups. After temporary positions at Brown University, Haverford College, and Washington University in St. Louis, Alperin took a permanent position at the University of Oklahoma in 1978. He was eventually promoted to full professor at the University of Oklahoma, but resigned his position to move to California in 1987. Upon moving to California, he found a position at San Jose State University, which he held until his retirement in 2015.

Alperin died on November 21, 2019, at his home in Carlsbad, California.

== Research ==
Alperin's work on real trees in the 80s (partly joint with Hyman Bass and Kenneth Moss) helped to stimulate interest in these objects, and helped establish them as a basic tool in geometric group theory. Alperin has also done foundational work on the mathematical theory of origami.
