= Jessie Marie Jacobs =

American mathematician (1890–1954)

Jessie Marie Jacobs Muller Offermann (1890–1954) was an American mathematician who also made contributions to the field of genetics.

Jessie M. Jacobs completed her undergraduate degree at McPherson College. After a year spent teaching high school she was awarded one of the first two fellowships to study graduate-level mathematics at the University of Kansas, where she earned her master's degree in 1916. She earned her Ph.D. in mathematics from the University of Illinois at Urbana–Champaign in 1919 under the supervision of Arthur Byron Coble. She became an associate professor at Rockford College and then, in 1920, an instructor at the University of Texas at Austin, where she also edited the Texas Mathematics Teachers' Bulletin. Her tenure at the university, along with that of colleague Goldie Printis Horton, is recognized by an annual lecture series.

While at the University of Texas, she met geneticist Hermann Joseph Muller when he asked her for help modeling the mathematics of mutation in flies. The couple married in 1923. Their son David, who would become a mathematician and computer scientist, was born the following year. Jessie's university appointment was terminated in 1924 against her wishes: her departmental colleagues felt that academia and motherhood were incompatible. Her own teaching career over, Jessie collaborated with her husband in the Drosophila laboratory and co-authored an article with him. Muller would later win a Nobel prize for the research he performed with Jessie's assistance during this period.

The marriage had grown strained, but in 1933 Jessie joined Hermann Muller in Berlin and then Leningrad for a portion of his Guggenheim fellowship. She divorced her husband in 1935 (first in the Soviet Union, then in Texas) and within a few months remarried Carlos Alberto Offermann. He had worked in Hermann Muller's Leningrad laboratory from 1933 to 1934. After marrying Jessie in Texas Carlos returned to his position, now relocated to Moscow, though his wife and stepson were unable to join him. So long as his father remained in the Soviet Union, a Texas judge refused to permit David Muller to leave the state. Jessie made a living in Austin by tutoring university students in mathematics, subletting a room, and supervising a Works Progress Administration group writing a history of Travis County.

In 1938, Carlos Offermann returned to Austin, and the family soon moved to Chicago. Assisted by his wife, Carlos pursued experimental work necessary for his Ph.D. Jessie was diagnosed with tuberculosis, and in 1940 the family moved to California, where they hoped she could recuperate. In 1942, her health had deteriorated and she was forced to enter a sanitarium, and was institutionalized at the time of her death.
