= R. Keith Dennis =

American mathematician (1944–2024)

Roger Keith Dennis (March 10, 1944 – December 12, 2024), known as R. Keith Dennis or Keith Dennis, was an American mathematician who worked in algebraic K-theory and group theory. His career was spent as a professor in the Department of Mathematics at Cornell University. Dennis was the executive editor of Mathematical Reviews as it transitioned from a printed resource to a mainly-digital one.

== Early life and career ==
Dennis was born in Vernon, Texas, on March 10, 1944, and grew up on a farm 8 miles north of Quanah, Texas. He graduated from Quanah High School in 1962, and attended Rice University, earning his bachelor's in 1966 and his doctorate in 1970. His thesis on "Presentation for the Elementary Group and the Functor $K_2$" was done under Stephen M. Gersten. He spent the academic year 1970–1971 at the Institute for Advanced Study in Princeton as the first assistant of John Milnor.

In 1971, Dennis joined the Department of Mathematics at Cornell University, and he was promoted to full professor in 1981. From 1987 to 1993 he served as the department chair. He retired to emeritus status in 2019.

From January 1995 through June 1998, Dennis was the executive editor of the American Mathematical Society’s Mathematical Reviews. During this period Mathematical Reviews designed and began the development of MathSciNet which went online in January 1996.

He was on the Board of Advisors of the American Institute of Mathematics since its inception.

In 2013, Dennis was in the inaugural class of fellows of the American Mathematical Society.

== Personal life and death ==
Dennis had four children. He died of metastatic prostate cancer on December 12, 2024, at the age of 80.

== Books ==
- 1982 (editor) Algebraic K-Theory. Proceedings of a Conference Held at Oberwolfach, June 1980, Part 1 and Part 2. (Springer)
- 1993 (with Benson Farb) Noncommutative Algebra (Springer, Graduate Texts in Mathematics Book 144), August 20, 1993, ISBN 978-0-387-94057-1
