= Saccheri–Legendre theorem =

In absolute geometry, the sum of the angles in a triangle is at most 180°

In absolute geometry, the Saccheri–Legendre theorem states that the sum of the angles in a triangle is at most 180°. Absolute geometry is the geometry obtained from assuming all the axioms that lead to Euclidean geometry with the exception of the axiom that is equivalent to the parallel postulate of Euclid. (Note: There are many axiom systems that yield Euclidean geometry and they all contain an axiom that is logically equivalent to Euclid's parallel postulate.)

The theorem is named after Giovanni Girolamo Saccheri and Adrien-Marie Legendre. It appeared in Saccheri's 1733 book Euclides ab omni naevo vindicatus [Euclid Freed of Every Flaw] but his work fell into obscurity. For many years after the theorem's rediscovery by Legendre it was called Legendre's theorem.

The existence of at least one triangle with angle sum of 180 degrees in absolute geometry implies Euclid's parallel postulate. Similarly, the existence of at least one triangle with angle sum of less than 180 degrees implies the characteristic postulate of hyperbolic geometry.

One proof of the Saccheri–Legendre theorem uses the Archimedean axiom, in the form that repeatedly halving one of two given angles will eventually produce an angle sharper than the second of the two. Max Dehn gave an example of a non-Legendrian geometry where the angle sum of a triangle is greater than 180 degrees, and a semi-Euclidean geometry where there is a triangle with an angle sum of 180 degrees but Euclid's parallel postulate fails. In these Dehn planes the Archimedean axiom does not hold.
