= Cyclically reduced word =

Concept in combinatorial group theory

In mathematics, cyclically reduced word is a concept of combinatorial group theory.

Let F(X) be a free group. Then a word in F(X) is said to be cyclically reduced if and only if every cyclic permutation of the word is reduced.

== Properties ==
- Every cyclic shift and the inverse of a cyclically reduced word are cyclically reduced again.
- Every word is conjugate to a cyclically reduced word. The cyclically reduced words are minimal-length representatives of the conjugacy classes in the free group. This representative is not uniquely determined, but it is unique up to cyclic shifts (since every cyclic shift is a conjugate element).
