= Parafree group =

In mathematics, in the realm of group theory, a group is said to be parafree if its quotients by the terms of its lower central series are the same as those of a free group and if it is residually nilpotent (the intersection of the terms of its lower central series is trivial).

Parafree groups share many properties with free groups, making it difficult to distinguish between these two types. Gilbert Baumslag was led to the study of parafree groups in attempts to resolve the conjecture that a group of cohomological dimension one is free. One of his fundamental results is that there exist parafree groups that are not free. With Urs Stammbach, he proved there exists a non-free parafree group with every countable subgroup being free.
