= Non-Archimedean ordered field =

Ordered field that does not satisfy the Archimedean property

In mathematics, a non-Archimedean ordered field is an ordered field that does not satisfy the Archimedean property. Such fields will contain infinitesimal and infinitely large elements, suitably defined.

== Definition ==
Suppose F is an ordered field. We say that F satisfies the Archimedean property if, for every two positive elements x and y of F, there exists a natural number n such that nx > y. Here, n denotes the field element resulting from forming the sum of n copies of the field element 1, so that nx is the sum of n copies of x.

An ordered field that does not satisfy the Archimedean property is a non-Archimedean ordered field.

== Examples ==
The fields of rational numbers and real numbers, with their usual orderings, satisfy the Archimedean property.

Examples of non-Archimedean ordered fields are the Levi-Civita field, the hyperreal numbers, the surreal numbers, the Dehn field, and the field of rational functions with real coefficients (where we define f > g to mean that f(t)>g(t) for large enough t).

== Infinite and infinitesimal elements ==
In a non-Archimedean ordered field, we can find two positive elements x and y such that, for every natural number n, nx ≤ y. This means that the positive element y/x is greater than every natural number n (so it is an "infinite element"), and the positive element x/y is smaller than 1/n for every natural number n (so it is an "infinitesimal element").

Conversely, if an ordered field contains an infinite or an infinitesimal element in this sense, then it is a non-Archimedean ordered field.

== Applications ==
Hyperreal fields, non-Archimedean ordered fields containing the real numbers as a subfield, are used to provide a mathematical foundation for nonstandard analysis.

Max Dehn used the Dehn field, an example of a non-Archimedean ordered field, to construct non-Euclidean geometries in which the parallel postulate fails to be true but nevertheless triangles have angles summing to π.

The field of rational functions over $\R$ can be used to construct an ordered field that is Cauchy complete (in the sense of convergence of Cauchy sequences) but is not the real numbers. This completion can be described as the field of formal Laurent series over $\R$. It is a non-Archimedean ordered field. Sometimes the term "complete" is used to mean that the least upper bound property holds, i.e. for Dedekind-completeness. There are no Dedekind-complete non-Archimedean ordered fields. The subtle distinction between these two uses of the word complete is occasionally a source of confusion.
