= Paul Schupp =

American mathematician (1937–2022)

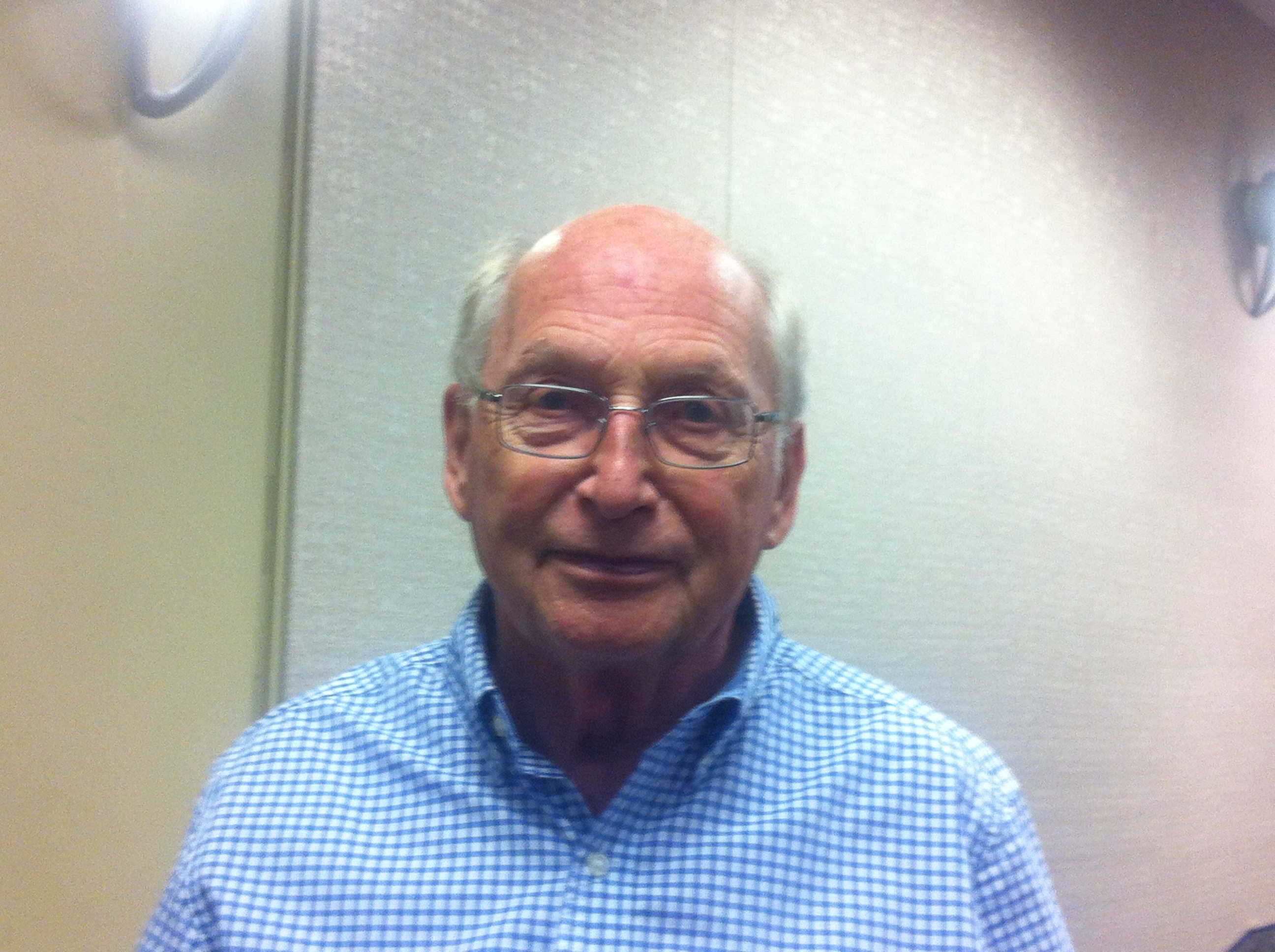
- Paul Schupp in June 2017
- Born: March 12, 1937; Cleveland, Ohio, U.S.
- Died: January 24, 2022 (aged 84); London, England, U.K.
- Education: University of Michigan
- Known for: Muller–Schupp theorem
- Awards: Guggenheim Fellowship
- Scientific career
- Fields: Mathematics
- Workplaces: University of Illinois
- Doctoral advisor: Roger Lyndon

Paul Eugene Schupp (March 12, 1937 – January 24, 2022) was an American-born British professor emeritus of mathematics at the University of Illinois at Urbana Champaign. He is known for his contributions to geometric group theory, computational complexity and the theory of computability.

He received his Ph.D. from the University of Michigan in 1966 under the direction of Roger Lyndon.

Together with Roger Lyndon he is the coauthor of the book "Combinatorial Group Theory" which provided a comprehensive account of the subject of Combinatorial Group Theory, starting with the work of Dehn in the 1910s and to late 1970s and remains a modern standard for the subject of small cancellation theory. Starting 1980's he worked on problems that explored the connections between Group theory and Computer Science and Complexity Theory. Together with David Muller he proved that a finitely generated group G has context-free word problem if and only if G is virtually free, which is now known as Muller–Schupp theorem.

In 1977, Schupp received a Guggenheim Fellowship. In 2012, he was named an inaugural fellow of the American Mathematical Society. In 2017, the conference "Groups and Computation" was organized at Stevens Institute of Technology celebrating the mathematical contributions of Paul Schupp. Schupp died on January 24, 2022, at the age of 84.
