= Algebraically closed group =

Group allowing solution of all algebraic equations

In group theory, a group $A\$ is algebraically closed if any finite set of equations and inequations that are applicable to $A\$ have a solution in $A\$ without needing a group extension. This notion will be made precise later in the article in § Formal definition.

== Informal discussion ==
Suppose we wished to find an element $x\$ of a group $G\$ satisfying the conditions (equations and inequations):

$$x^2=1\$$
$$x^3=1\$$
$$x\ne 1\$$

Then it is easy to see that this is impossible because the first two equations imply $x=1\$. In this case we say the set of conditions are inconsistent with $G\$. (In fact this set of conditions are inconsistent with any group whatsoever.)

$G\$
$. \$	$\underline{1} \$	$\underline{a} \$
$\underline{1} \$	$1 \$	$a \$
$\underline{a} \$	$a \$	$1 \$

Now suppose $G\$ is the group with the multiplication table to the right.

Then the conditions:

$$x^2=1\$$
$$x\ne 1\$$

have a solution in $G\$, namely $x=a\$.

However the conditions:

$$x^4=1\$$
$$x^2a^{-1} = 1\$$

Do not have a solution in $G\$, as can easily be checked.

$H\$
$. \$	$\underline{1} \$	$\underline{a} \$	$\underline{b} \$	$\underline{c} \$
$\underline{1} \$	$1 \$	$a \$	$b \$	$c \$
$\underline{a} \$	$a \$	$1 \$	$c \$	$b \$
$\underline{b} \$	$b \$	$c \$	$a \$	$1 \$
$\underline{c} \$	$c \$	$b \$	$1 \$	$a \$

However, if we extend the group $G \$ to the group $H \$ with the adjacent multiplication table:

Then the conditions have two solutions, namely $x=b \$ and $x=c \$.

Thus there are three possibilities regarding such conditions:

- They may be inconsistent with $G \$ and have no solution in any extension of $G \$.
- They may have a solution in $G \$.
- They may have no solution in $G \$ but nevertheless have a solution in some extension $H \$ of $G \$.

It is reasonable to ask whether there are any groups $A \$ such that whenever a set of conditions like these have a solution at all, they have a solution in $A \$ itself? The answer turns out to be "yes", and we call such groups algebraically closed groups.

== Formal definition ==
We first need some preliminary ideas.

If $G\$ is a group and $F\$ is the free group on countably many generators, then by a finite set of equations and inequations with coefficients in $G\$ we mean a pair of subsets $E\$ and $I\$ of $F\star G$ the free product of $F\$ and $G\$.

This formalizes the notion of a set of equations and inequations consisting of variables $x_i\$ and elements $g_j\$ of $G\$. The set $E\$ represents equations like:

$$x_1^2g_1^4x_3=1$$
$$x_3^2g_2x_4g_1=1$$
$$\dots\$$

The set $I\$ represents inequations like

$$g_5^{-1}x_3\ne 1$$
$$\dots\$$

By a solution in $G\$ to this finite set of equations and inequations, we mean a homomorphism $f:F\rightarrow G$, such that $\tilde{f}(e)=1\$ for all $e\in E$ and $\tilde{f}(i)\ne 1\$ for all $i\in I$, where $\tilde{f}$ is the unique homomorphism $\tilde{f}:F\star G\rightarrow G$ that equals $f\$ on $F\$ and is the identity on $G\$.

This formalizes the idea of substituting elements of $G\$ for the variables to get true identities and inidentities. In the example the substitutions $x_1\mapsto g_6, x_3\mapsto g_7$ and $x_4\mapsto g_8$ yield:

$$g_6^2g_1^4g_7=1$$
$$g_7^2g_2g_8g_1=1$$
$$\dots\$$
$$g_5^{-1}g_7\ne 1$$
$$\dots\$$

We say the finite set of equations and inequations is consistent with $G\$ if we can solve them in a "bigger" group $H\$. More formally:

The equations and inequations are consistent with $G\$ if there is a group$H\$ and an embedding $h:G\rightarrow H$ such that the finite set of equations and inequations $\tilde{h}(E)$ and $\tilde{h}(I)$ has a solution in $H\$, where $\tilde{h}$ is the unique homomorphism $\tilde{h}:F\star G\rightarrow F\star H$ that equals $h\$ on $G\$ and is the identity on $F\$.

Now we formally define the group $A\$ to be algebraically closed if every finite set of equations and inequations that has coefficients in $A\$ and is consistent with $A\$ has a solution in $A\$.

== Known results ==
It is difficult to give concrete examples of algebraically closed groups as the following results indicate:

- Every countable group can be embedded in a countable algebraically closed group.
- Every algebraically closed group is simple.
- No algebraically closed group is finitely generated.
- An algebraically closed group cannot be recursively presented.
- A finitely generated group has a solvable word problem if and only if it can be embedded in every algebraically closed group.

The proofs of these results are in general very complex. However, a sketch of the proof that a countable group $C\$ can be embedded in an algebraically closed group follows.

First we embed $C\$ in a countable group $C_1\$ with the property that every finite set of equations with coefficients in $C\$ that is consistent in $C_1\$ has a solution in $C_1\$ as follows:

There are only countably many finite sets of equations and inequations with coefficients in $C\$. Fix an enumeration $S_0,S_1,S_2,\dots\$ of them. Define groups $D_0,D_1,D_2,\dots\$ inductively by:

$$D_0 = C\$$

$$D_{i+1} =
\left\{\begin{matrix}
D_i\ &\mbox{if}\ S_i\ \mbox{is not consistent with}\ D_i \\
\langle D_i,h_1,h_2,\dots,h_n \rangle &\mbox{if}\ S_i\ \mbox{has a solution in}\ H\supseteq D_i\ \mbox{with}\ x_j\mapsto h_j\ 1\le j\le n
\end{matrix}\right.$$

Now let:

$$C_1=\cup_{i=0}^{\infty}D_{i}$$

Now iterate this construction to get a sequence of groups $C=C_0,C_1,C_2,\dots\$ and let:

$$A=\cup_{i=0}^{\infty}C_{i}$$

Then $A\$ is a countable group containing $C\$. It is algebraically closed because any finite set of equations and inequations that is consistent with $A\$ must have coefficients in some $C_i\$ and so must have a solution in $C_{i+1}\$.

== See also ==
- Algebraic closure
  - Algebraically closed field
