= Group isomorphism problem =

Decision problem

In abstract algebra, the group isomorphism problem is the decision problem of determining whether two given finite group presentations refer to isomorphic groups.

The isomorphism problem was formulated by Max Dehn, and together with the word problem and conjugacy problem, is one of three fundamental decision problems in group theory he identified in 1911. All three problems, formulated as ranging over all finitely presented groups, are undecidable. In the case of the isomorphism problem, this means that there does not exist a computer algorithm that takes two finite group presentations and decides whether or not the groups are isomorphic, regardless of how (finitely) much time is allowed for the algorithm to run and how (finitely) much memory is available. In fact the problem of deciding whether a finitely presented group is trivial is undecidable, a consequence of the Adian–Rabin theorem due to Sergei Adian and Michael O. Rabin.

However, there are some classes of finitely presented groups for which the restriction of the isomorphism problem is known to be decidable. They include finitely generated abelian groups, finite groups, Gromov-hyperbolic groups, virtually torsion-free relatively hyperbolic groups with nilpotent parabolics, one-relator groups with non-trivial center, and two-generator one-relator groups with torsion.

The group isomorphism problem, restricted to the groups that are given by multiplication tables, can be reduced to a graph isomorphism problem but not vice versa. Both have quasi-polynomial-time algorithms, the former since 1978 attributed to Robert Tarjan and the latter since 2015 by László Babai. A small but important improvement for the case p-groups of class 2 was obtained in 2023 by Xiaorui Sun.
