= Dehn plane =

In geometry, Max Dehn introduced two examples of planes, a semi-Euclidean geometry and a non-Legendrian geometry, that have infinitely many lines parallel to a given one that pass through a given point, but where the sum of the angles of a triangle is at least π. A similar phenomenon occurs in hyperbolic geometry, except that the sum of the angles of a triangle is less than π. Dehn's examples use a non-Archimedean field, so that the Archimedean axiom is violated. They were introduced by Max Dehn (1900) and discussed by Hilbert (1902, pp. 127–130, or pp. 42–43 in some later editions).

== Dehn's non-archimedean field Ω(t) ==
To construct his geometries, Dehn used a non-Archimedean ordered Pythagorean field Ω(t), a Pythagorean closure of the field of rational functions R(t), consisting of the smallest field of real-valued functions on the real line containing the real constants, the identity function t (taking any real number to itself) and closed under the operation $\omega \mapsto \sqrt{1+\omega^2}$. The field Ω(t) is ordered by putting x > y if the function x is larger than y for sufficiently large reals. An element x of Ω(t) is called finite if m < x < n for some integers m, n, and is called infinite otherwise.

== Dehn's semi-Euclidean geometry ==
The set of all pairs (x, y), where x and y are any (possibly infinite) elements of the field Ω(t), and with the usual metric

$$\|(x,y)\| = \sqrt{x^2+y^2},$$

which takes values in Ω(t), gives a model of Euclidean geometry. The parallel postulate is true in this model, but if the deviation from the perpendicular is infinitesimal (meaning smaller than any positive rational number), the intersecting lines intersect at a point that is not in the finite part of the plane. Hence, if the model is restricted to the finite part of the plane (points (x,y) with x and y finite), a geometry is obtained in which the parallel postulate fails but the sum of the angles of a triangle is π. This is Dehn's semi-Euclidean geometry. It is discussed in Rucker (1982, pp. 91–2).

== Dehn's non-Legendrian geometry ==
In the same paper, Dehn also constructed an example of a non-Legendrian geometry where there are infinitely many lines through a point not meeting another line, but the sum of the angles in a triangle exceeds π. Riemann's elliptic geometry over Ω(t) consists of the projective plane over Ω(t), which can be identified with the affine plane of points (x:y:1) together with the "line at infinity", and has the property that the sum of the angles of any triangle is greater than π The non-Legendrian geometry consists of the points (x:y:1) of this affine subspace such that tx and ty are finite (where as above t is the element of Ω(t) represented by the identity function). Legendre's theorem states that the sum of the angles of a triangle is at most π, but assumes Archimedes's axiom, and Dehn's example shows that Legendre's theorem need not hold if Archimedes' axiom is dropped.
