= Residually finite group =

Type of mathematical group

In the mathematical field of group theory, a group G is residually finite or finitely approximable if for every element g that is not the identity in G there is a homomorphism h from G to a finite group, such that $h(g) \neq 1.\,$

There are a number of equivalent definitions:

- A group is residually finite if for each non-identity element in the group, there is a normal subgroup of finite index not containing that element.
- A group is residually finite if and only if the intersection of all its subgroups of finite index is trivial.
- A group is residually finite if and only if the intersection of all its normal subgroups of finite index is trivial.
- A group is residually finite if and only if it can be embedded inside the direct product of a family of finite groups.

== Definition ==
A group $G$ is residually finite if, for every $1_G \neq g \in G$ (Note: where $1_G$ denotes the identity element of the group $G$), there exists some finite group $F$ and some group homomorphism $\phi : G \to F$ such that $\phi(g) \neq 1_F$. There are other equivalent characterizations of residually finite groups:

- A group $G$ is residually finite if and only if, for every $g, h \in G$ where $g \neq h$, there exists some finite group $F$ and some group homomorphism $\phi : G \to F$ such that $\phi(g) \neq \phi(h)$.
- A group is residually finite if and only if its residual subgroup (or profinite kernel) is trivial. The residual subgroup of a group is the intersection of all subgroups that have a finite index, or equivalently, the intersection of all normal subgroups of finite index.
- A group is residually finite if and only if it is isomorphic to a subgroup of a direct product of a family of finite groups.

== Examples ==
Every finite group is residually finite. This can be shown by considering the group itself as the finite group, and its identity homomorphism as the homomorphism to a finite group.

The integers are an example of an infinite residually finite group. Given any non-zero integer $k$ and letting $m$ be an integer with $m > |k|$, the canonical homomorphism from the integers to the group of integers modulo $m$, $\phi : \mathbb{Z} \to \mathbb{Z}/m\mathbb{Z}$, does not map $k$ onto $0$. a similar technique done on the entries of the matrices of $GL_n(\mathbb{Z})$, for $n \geq 1$, shows that this group is also residually finite. More generally, all finitely generated abelian groups are residually finite. Furthermore, the automorphism group of any finitely generated residually finite group will be residually finite.

Subgroups of a residually finite group are themselves residually finite. The direct product and direct sum of residually finite groups will also be residually finite.

Any inverse limit of residually finite groups is residually finite. In particular, all profinite groups are residually finite. One example of a profinite group is the p-adic integers.

If a group has a subgroup of finite index which is residually finite (that is, a virtually residually finite group), then said group is also residually finite.

More examples of groups that are residually finite are free groups, finitely generated nilpotent groups, polycyclic groups, finitely generated linear groups, and fundamental groups of compact 3-manifolds.

=== Nonexamples ===
A divisible group is a group $G$ where every $g \in G$ and integer $n \geq 1$ has an element $h \in G$ where $h^n = g$. Examples of nontrivial divisible groups include the rational numbers, the real numbers, the complex numbers, the additive group of a vector space over the rationals, and the additive group of every field with characteristic 0. Every nontrivial divisible group fails to be residually finite as every homomorphism from a divisible group to a finite group is trivial.

Examples of non-residually finite groups can be constructed using the fact that all finitely generated residually finite groups are Hopfian groups. For example the Baumslag–Solitar group $B(1,m)$ for $|m| \geq 2$ is finitely generated, residually finite, and Hopfian , but $B(2,3)$ is finitely generated yet not Hopfian, and therefore not residually finite.

Every infinite simple group is not residually finite because the only normal subgroup with a finite index will be the group itself. This implies that the group of permutations on an infinite set with finite support is not residually finite as the subgroup with the permutations of signature 1 is an infinite simple group. This can be used to show that the subgroup of permutation on the integers generated by the translation $n \mapsto n+1$ and the transposition of $0$ and $1$ is a finitely generated Hopfian group that is not residually finite.

Group extensions of residually finite groups also need not be residually finite. One counter example is the wreath product of $A_5$, the alternating group of degree 5, with the integers, both of which are residually finite.

== Properties ==
Finitely presented residually finite groups have a solvable word problem, meaning there is a procedure where, given the group's generators, one can find the words that equate to the identity element.

== Topology ==
Every group G may be made into a topological group by taking as a basis of open neighbourhoods of the identity, the collection of all normal subgroups of finite index in G. The resulting topology is called the profinite topology on G. A group is residually finite if, and only if, its profinite topology is Hausdorff. If this group is also infinite and finitely generated, then said topology is totally disconnected, and the completion is the inverse limit of a sequence of finite quotients of this group, making it a profinite group.

A group whose cyclic subgroups are closed in the profinite topology is said to be $\Pi_C\,$. Groups each of whose finitely generated subgroups are closed in the profinite topology are called subgroup separable (also LERF, for locally extended residually finite). A group in which every conjugacy class is closed in the profinite topology is called conjugacy separable.

== Varieties of residually finite groups ==
One question is: what are the properties of a variety all of whose groups are residually finite? Two results about these are:

- Any variety comprising only residually finite groups is generated by an A-group.
- For any variety comprising only residually finite groups, it contains a finite group such that all members are embedded in a direct product of that finite group.

== See also ==
- Residual property (mathematics)
