= Baumslag–Solitar group =

Term in group theory mathematics

One sheet of the Cayley graph of the Baumslag–Solitar group BS(1, 2). Red edges correspond to a and blue edges correspond to b.

The sheets of the Cayley graph of the Baumslag-Solitar group BS(1, 2) fit together into an infinite binary tree.

Visualization comparing the sheet and the binary tree Cayley graph of $\text{BS}(1,2)$. Red and blue edges correspond to $a$ and $b$, respectively.

In the mathematical field of group theory, the Baumslag–Solitar groups are examples of two-generator one-relator groups that play an important role in combinatorial group theory and geometric group theory as (counter)examples and test-cases. They are given by the group presentation

$$\left \langle a, b \ : \ b a^m b^{-1} = a^n \right \rangle.$$

For each integer m and n, the Baumslag–Solitar group is denoted BS(m, n). The relation in the presentation is called the Baumslag–Solitar relation.

Some of the various BS(m, n) are well-known groups. BS(1, 1) is the free abelian group on two generators, and BS(1, −1) is the fundamental group of the Klein bottle.

The groups were defined by Gilbert Baumslag and Donald Solitar in 1962 to provide examples of non-Hopfian groups. The groups contain residually finite groups, Hopfian groups that are not residually finite, and non-Hopfian groups.

== Linear representation ==
Define

$$A= \begin{pmatrix}1&1\\0&1\end{pmatrix}, \qquad B= \begin{pmatrix}\frac{n}{m}&0\\0&1\end{pmatrix}.$$

The matrix group G generated by A and B is a homomorphic image of BS(m, n), via the homomorphism induced by

$$a\mapsto A, \qquad b\mapsto B.$$

This will not, in general, be an isomorphism. For instance if BS(m, n) is not residually finite (i.e. if it is not the case that |m| = 1, |n| = 1, or |m| = |n|) it cannot be isomorphic to a finitely generated linear group, which is known to be residually finite by a theorem of Anatoly Maltsev.

== History ==
The group BS(1, 2) first appeared in a 1951 paper of Graham Higman. It was for this reason that, according to Meier, "Baumslag [...] waged a vigorous, sustained, and ultimately doomed campaign against referring to BS(1, 2) as a Baumslag–Solitar group."

== See also ==
- Binary tiling
- Solv geometry
