= Conjugacy problem =

Problem on words in group theory

In abstract algebra, the conjugacy problem for a group G with a given presentation is the decision problem of determining, given two words x and y in G, whether or not they represent conjugate elements of G. That is, the problem is to determine whether there exists an element z of G such that
$$y = zxz^{-1}.\,\!$$
The conjugacy problem is also known as the transformation problem.

The conjugacy problem was identified by Max Dehn in 1911 as one of the fundamental decision problems in group theory; the other two being the word problem and the isomorphism problem. The conjugacy problem contains the word problem as a special case: if x and y are words, deciding if they are the same word is equivalent to deciding if $xy^{-1}$ is the identity, which is the same as deciding if it's conjugate to the identity. In 1912 Dehn gave an algorithm that solves both the word and conjugacy problem for the fundamental groups of closed orientable two-dimensional manifolds of genus greater than or equal to 2 (the genus 0 and genus 1 cases being trivial).

It is known that the conjugacy problem is undecidable for many classes of groups. Classes of group presentations for which it is known to be solvable include:

- free groups (no defining relators)
- one-relator groups with torsion
- braid groups
- knot groups
- finitely presented conjugacy separable groups
- finitely generated abelian groups (relators include all commutators)
- Gromov-hyperbolic groups
- biautomatic groups
- CAT(0) groups
- Fundamental groups of geometrizable 3-manifolds
