= Gilbert Baumslag =

American mathematician

Gilbert Baumslag (April 30, 1933 – October 20, 2014) was a Distinguished Professor at the City College of New York, with joint appointments in mathematics, computer science, and electrical engineering. He was director of the Center for Algorithms and Interactive Scientific Software, which grew out of the MAGNUS computational group theory project he also headed. Baumslag was also the organizer of the New York Group Theory Seminar.

Baumslag graduated from the University of the Witwatersrand in South Africa with a B.Sc. Honours (Masters) and D.Sc. He earned his Ph.D. from the University of Manchester in 1958; his thesis, written under the direction of Bernhard Neumann, was titled Some aspects of groups with unique roots. His contributions include the Baumslag–Solitar groups and parafree groups.

Baumslag was a visiting scholar at the Institute for Advanced Study in 1968–69. In 2012, he became a fellow of the American Mathematical Society.

== Works ==
- Gilbert Baumslag, Groups with the same lower central sequence as a relatively free group. I. The groups, Transactions of the American Mathematical Society 129 (1967), 308–321. MR0217157
- Gilbert Baumslag, Groups with the same lower central sequence as a relatively free group. II. Properties, Transactions of the American Mathematical Society 142 (1969), 507–538. MR0245653
- Gilbert Baumslag and Donald Solitar, Some two-generator one-relator non-Hopfian groups, Bulletin of the American Mathematical Society 68 (1962), 199–201. MR0142635
