= Combinatorial group theory =

In mathematics, combinatorial group theory is the theory of free groups, and the concept of a presentation of a group by generators and relations. It is much used in geometric topology, the fundamental group of a simplicial complex having in a natural and geometric way such a presentation. A very closely related topic is geometric group theory, which today largely subsumes combinatorial group theory, using techniques from outside combinatorics besides.

It also comprises a number of algorithmically insoluble problems, most notably the word problem for groups; and the classical Burnside problem.

== History ==
See the book by Chandler and Magnus for a detailed history of combinatorial group theory.

Combinatorial group theory was anticipated in the 1856 icosian calculus of William Rowan Hamilton, who studied the icosahedral symmetry group via the edge graph of the dodecahedron.

The foundations of combinatorial group theory were laid by Walther von Dyck, student of Felix Klein, in the early 1880s, who gave the first systematic study of groups by generators and relations.
