= CAT(0) group =

Type of group used in topology and geometric group theory

In mathematics, a CAT(0) group is a finitely generated group with a group action on a CAT(0) space that is geometrically proper, cocompact, and isometric. They form a possible notion of non-positively curved group in geometric group theory.

== Definition ==
Let $G$ be a group. Then $G$ is said to be a CAT(0) group if there exists a metric space $X$ and an action of $G$ on $X$ such that:

1. $X$ is a CAT(0) metric space
2. The action of $G$ on $X$ is by isometries, i.e. it is a group homomorphism $G \longrightarrow \mathrm{Isom}(X)$
3. The action of $G$ on $X$ is geometrically proper (see below)
4. The action is cocompact: there exists a compact subset $K\subset X$ whose translates under $G$ together cover $X$, i.e. $X = G\cdot K = \bigcup_{g\in G} g\cdot K$

An group action on a metric space satisfying conditions 2 - 4 is sometimes called geometric.

This definition is analogous to one of the many possible definitions of a Gromov-hyperbolic group, where the condition that $X$ is CAT(0) is replaced with Gromov-hyperbolicity of $X$. However, contrarily to hyperbolicity, CAT(0)-ness of a space is not a quasi-isometry invariant, which makes the theory of CAT(0) groups a lot harder.

=== Metric properness ===
The suitable notion of properness for actions by isometries on metric spaces differs slightly from that of a properly discontinuous action in topology. An isometric action of a group $G$ on a metric space $X$ is said to be geometrically proper if, for every $\ce{x\in X}$, there exists $r > 0$ such that $\{g\in G | B(x, r)\cap g\cdot B(x, r) \neq \emptyset\}$is finite.

Since a compact subset $K$ of $X$ can be covered by finitely many balls $B(x_i, r_i)$ such that $B(x_i, 2r_i)$ has the above property, metric properness implies proper discontinuity. However, metric properness is a stronger condition in general. The two notions coincide for proper metric spaces.

If a group $G$ acts (geometrically) properly and cocompactly by isometries on a length space $X$, then $X$ is actually a proper geodesic space (see metric Hopf-Rinow theorem), and $G$ is finitely generated (see Švarc-Milnor lemma). In particular, CAT(0) groups are finitely generated, and the space $X$ involved in the definition is actually proper.

== Examples ==
=== CAT(0) groups ===
- Finite groups are trivially CAT(0), and finitely generated abelian groups are CAT(0) by acting on euclidean spaces.
- Crystallographic groups
- Fundamental groups of compact Riemannian manifolds having non-positive sectional curvature are CAT(0) thanks to their action on the universal cover, which is a Cartan-Hadamard manifold.
- More generally, fundamental groups of compact, locally CAT(0) metric spaces are CAT(0) groups, as a consequence of the metric Cartan-Hadamard theorem. This includes groups whose Dehn complex can wear a piecewise-euclidean metric of non-positive curvature. Examples of these are provided by presentations satisfying small cancellation conditions.
- Any finitely presented group is a quotient of a CAT(0) group (in fact, of a fundamental group of a 2-dimensional CAT(-1) complex) with finitely generated kernel.
- Free products of CAT(0) groups and free amalgamated products of CAT(0) groups over finite or infinite cyclic subgroups are CAT(0).
- Coxeter groups are CAT(0), and act properly cocompactly on CAT(0) cube complexes.
- Fundamental groups of hyperbolic knot complements.
- $\mathrm{Aut}(F_2)$, the automorphism group of the free group of rank 2, is CAT(0).
- The braid groups $B_n$, for $n\le 6$, are known to be CAT(0). It is conjectured that all braid groups are CAT(0).
- Limit groups over free groups are CAT(0) with isolated flats.

=== Non-CAT(0) groups ===
- Mapping class groups of closed surfaces with genus $\ge 3$, or surfaces with genus $\ge 2$ and nonempty boundary or at least two punctures, are not CAT(0).
- Some free-by-cyclic groups cannot act properly by isometries on a CAT(0) space, although they have quadratic isoperimetric inequality.
- Automorphism groups of free groups of rank $\ge 3$ have exponential Dehn function, and hence (see below) are not CAT(0).

== Properties ==
=== Properties of the group ===
Let $G$ be a CAT(0) group. Then:

- There are finitely many conjugacy classes of finite subgroups in $G$. In particular, there is a bound for cardinals of finite subgroups of $G$.
- The solvable subgroup theorem: any solvable subgroup of $G$ is finitely generated and virtually free abelian. Moreover, there is a finite bound on the rank of free abelian subgroups of $G$.
- If $G$ is infinite, then $G$ contains an element of infinite order.
- If $A$ is a free abelian subgroup of $G$ and $C$ is a finitely generated subgroup of $G$ containing $A$ in its center, then a finite index subgroup $D$ of $C$ splits as a direct product $D \cong A\times B$.
- The Dehn function of $G$ is at most quadratic.
- $G$ has a finite presentation with solvable word problem and conjugacy problem.

=== Properties of the action ===
Let $G$ be a group acting properly cocompactly by isometries on a CAT(0) space $X$.

- Any finite subgroup of $G$ fixes a nonempty closed convex set.
- For any infinite order element $g\in G$, the set $\min(g)$ of elements $x\in X$ such that $d(g\cdot x, x) > 0$ is minimal is a nonempty, closed, convex, $g$-invariant subset of $X$, called the minimal set of $g$. Moreover, it splits isometrically as a (l²) direct product $\min(g) = A\times \R$ of a closed convex set $A\subset X$ and a geodesic line, in such a way that $g$ acts trivially on the $A$ factor and by translation on the $\R$ factor. A geodesic line on which $g$ acts by translation is always of the form $\{a\}\times \R$, $a\in A$, and is called an axis of $g$. Such an element is called hyperbolic.
- The flat torus theorem: any free abelian subgroup $\Z^n \cong A \subset G$ leaves invariant a subspace $F\subset X$ isometric to $\R^n$, and $A$ acts cocompactly on $F$ (hence the quotient $F/A$ is a flat torus).
- In certain situations, a splitting of $G \cong G_1\times G_2$ as a cartesian product induces a splitting of the space $X\cong X_1\times X_2$ and of the action.
