= Small cancellation theory =

In the mathematical subject of group theory, small cancellation theory studies groups given by group presentations satisfying small cancellation conditions, that is where defining relations have "small overlaps" with each other. Small cancellation conditions imply algebraic, geometric and algorithmic properties of the group. Finitely presented groups satisfying sufficiently strong small cancellation conditions are word hyperbolic and have word problem solvable by Dehn's algorithm. Small cancellation methods are also used for constructing Tarski monsters, and for solutions of Burnside's problem.

== History ==
Some ideas underlying the small cancellation theory go back to the work of Max Dehn in the 1910s. Dehn proved that fundamental groups of closed orientable surfaces of genus at least two have word problem solvable by what is now called Dehn's algorithm. His proof involved drawing the Cayley graph of such a group in the hyperbolic plane and performing curvature estimates via the Gauss–Bonnet theorem for a closed loop in the Cayley graph to conclude that such a loop must contain a large portion (more than a half) of a defining relation.

A 1949 paper of Tartakovskii was an immediate precursor for small cancellation theory: this paper provided a solution of the word problem for a class of groups satisfying a complicated set of combinatorial conditions, where small cancellation type assumptions played a key role. The standard version of small cancellation theory, as it is used today, was developed by Martin Greendlinger in a series of papers in the early 1960s, who primarily dealt with the "metric" small cancellation conditions. In particular, Greendlinger proved that finitely presented groups satisfying the C′(1/6) small cancellation condition have word problem solvable by Dehn's algorithm. The theory was further refined and formalized in the subsequent work of Lyndon, Schupp and Lyndon-Schupp, who also treated the case of non-metric small cancellation conditions and developed a version of small cancellation theory for amalgamated free products and HNN-extensions.

Small cancellation theory was further generalized by Alexander Ol'shanskii who developed a "graded" version of the theory where the set of defining relations comes equipped with a filtration and where a defining relator of a particular grade is allowed to have a large overlap with a defining relator of a higher grade. Olshaskii used graded small cancellation theory to construct various "monster" groups, including the Tarski monster and also to give a new proof that free Burnside groups of large odd exponent are infinite (this result was originally proved by Adian and Novikov in 1968 using more combinatorial methods).

Small cancellation theory supplied a basic set of examples and ideas for the theory of word-hyperbolic groups that was put forward by Gromov in a seminal 1987 monograph "Hyperbolic groups".

== Main definitions ==
The exposition below largely follows Ch. V of the book of Lyndon and Schupp.

=== Pieces ===
Let

$$G=\langle X\mid R\rangle\qquad (*)$$

be a group presentation where R ⊆ F(X) is a set of freely reduced and cyclically reduced words in the free group F(X) such that R is symmetrized, that is, closed under taking cyclic permutations and inverses.

A nontrivial freely reduced word u in F(X) is called a piece with respect to (∗) if there exist two distinct elements r_{1}, r_{2} in R that have u as maximal common initial segment.

Note that if $G=\langle X\mid S\rangle$ is a group presentation where the set of defining relators S is not symmetrized, we can always take the symmetrized closure R of S, where R consists of all cyclic permutations of elements of S and S^{−1}. Then R is symmetrized and $G=\langle X\mid R\rangle$ is also a presentation of G.

=== Metric small cancellation conditions ===
Let 0 < λ < 1. Presentation (∗) as above is said to satisfy the C′(λ) small cancellation condition if whenever u is a piece with respect to (∗) and u is a subword of some r ∈ R, then |u| < λ|r|. Here |v| is the length of a word v.

The condition C′(λ) is sometimes called a metric small cancellation condition.

=== Non-metric small cancellation conditions ===
Let p ≥ 3 be an integer. A group presentation (∗) as above is said to satisfy the C(p) small cancellation condition if whenever r ∈ R and

$$r=u_1\dots u_m$$

where u_{i} are pieces and where the above product is freely reduced as written, then m ≥ p. That is, no defining relator can be written as a reduced product of fewer than p pieces.

Let q ≥ 3 be an integer. A group presentation (∗) as above is said to satisfy the T(q) small cancellation condition if whenever 3 ≤ t < q and r_{1},...,r_{t} in R are such that r_{1} ≠ r_{2}^{−1},..., r_{t} ≠ r_{1}^{−1} then at least one of the products r_{1}r_{2},...,r_{t−1}r_{t}, r_{t}r_{1} is freely reduced as written.

Geometrically, condition T(q) essentially means that if D is a reduced van Kampen diagram over (∗) then every interior vertex of D of degree at least three actually has degree at least q.

=== Examples ===
- Let $G=\langle a,b\mid aba^{-1}b^{-1}\rangle$ be the standard presentation of the free abelian group of rank two. Then for the symmetrized closure of this presentation the only pieces are words of length 1. This symmetrized form satisfies the C(4)–T(4) small cancellation conditions and the C′(λ) condition for any 1 > λ > 1/4.
- Let $G=\langle a_1,b_1,\dots, a_k,b_k\mid [a_1,b_1]\cdot\dots\cdot [a_k,b_k]\rangle$, where k ≥ 2, be the standard presentation of the fundamental group of a closed orientable surface of genus k. Then for the symmetrization of this presentation the only pieces are words of length 1 and this symmetrization satisfies the C′(1/7) and C(8) small cancellation conditions.
- Let $G=\langle a,b\mid abab^2ab^3\dots ab^{100}\rangle$. Then, up to inversion, every piece for the symmetrized version of this presentation, has the form b^{i}ab^{j} or b^{i}, where 0 ≤ i,j ≤ 100. This symmetrization satisfies the C′(1/20) small cancellation condition.
- If a symmetrized presentation satisfies the C′(1/m) condition then it also satisfies the C(m) condition.
- Let r ∈ F(X) be a nontrivial cyclically reduced word which is not a proper power in F(X) and let n ≥ 2. Then the symmetrized closure of the presentation $G=\langle X\mid r^n\rangle$ satisfies the C(2n) and C′(1/n) small cancellation conditions.

== Basic results of small cancellation theory ==
=== Greendlinger's lemma ===
The main result regarding the metric small cancellation condition is the following statement (see Theorem 4.4 in Ch. V of) which is usually called

Greendlinger's lemma: Let (∗) be a group presentation as above satisfying the C′(λ) small cancellation condition where 0 ≤ λ ≤ 1/6. Let w ∈ F(X) be a nontrivial freely reduced word such that w = 1 in G. Then there is a subword v of w and a defining relator r ∈ R such that v is also a subword of r and such that

$$\left|v\right| > \left(1-3\lambda\right)\left|r\right|$$

Note that the assumption λ ≤ 1/6 implies that (1 − 3λ) ≥ 1/2, so that w contains a subword more than a half of some defining relator.

Greendlinger's lemma is obtained as a corollary of the following geometric statement:

Under the assumptions of Greendlinger's lemma, let D be a reduced van Kampen diagram over (∗) with a cyclically reduced boundary label such that D contains at least two regions. Then there exist two distinct regions D_{1} and D_{2} in D such that for j = 1,2 the region D_{j} intersects the boundary cycle ∂D of D in a simple arc whose length is bigger than (1 − 3λ)|∂D_{j}|.

This result in turn is proved by considering a dual diagram for D. There one defines a combinatorial notion of curvature (which, by the small cancellation assumptions, is negative at every interior vertex), and one then obtains a combinatorial version of the Gauss–Bonnet theorem. Greendlinger's lemma is proved as a consequence of this analysis and in this way the proof evokes the ideas of the original proof of Dehn for the case of surface groups.

=== Dehn's algorithm ===
For any symmetrized group presentation (∗), the following abstract procedure is called Dehn's algorithm:

- Given a freely reduced word w on X^{±1}, construct a sequence of freely reduced words w = w_{0}, w_{1}, w_{2},..., as follows.
- Suppose w_{j} is already constructed. If it is the empty word, terminate the algorithm. Otherwise check if w_{j} contains a subword v such that v is also a subword of some defining relator r = vu ∈ R such that |v| > |r|/2. If no, terminate the algorithm with output w_{j}. If yes, replace v by u^{−1} in w_{j}, then freely reduce, denote the resulting freely reduced word by w_{j+1} and go to the next step of the algorithm.

Note that we always have

|w_{0}| > |w_{1}| > |w_{2}| >...

which implies that the process must terminate in at most |w| steps. Moreover, all the words w_{j} represent the same element of G as does w and hence if the process terminates with the empty word, then w represents the identity element of G.

One says that for a symmetrized presentation (∗) Dehn's algorithm solves the word problem in G if the converse is also true, that is if for any freely reduced word w in F(X) this word represents the identity element of G if and only if Dehn's algorithm, starting from w, terminates in the empty word.

Greendlinger's lemma implies that for a C′(1/6) presentation Dehn's algorithm solves the word problem.

If a C′(1/6) presentation (∗) is finite (that is both X and R are finite), then Dehn's algorithm is an actual non-deterministic algorithm in the sense of recursion theory. However, even if (∗) is an infinite C′(1/6) presentation, Dehn's algorithm, understood as an abstract procedure, still correctly decides whether or not a word in the generators X^{±1} represents the identity element of G.

=== Asphericity ===
Let (∗) be a C′(1/6) or, more generally, C(6) presentation where every r ∈ R is not a proper power in F(X) then G is aspherical in the following sense. Consider a minimal subset S of R such that the symmetrized closure of S is equal to R. Thus if r and s are distinct elements of S then r is not a cyclic permutation of s^{±1} and $G=\langle X\mid S\rangle$ is another presentation for G. Let Y be the presentation complex for this presentation. Then (see and Theorem 13.3 in), under the above assumptions on (∗), Y is a classifying space for G, that is G = π_{1}(Y) and the universal cover of Y is contractible. In particular, this implies that G is torsion-free and has cohomological dimension two.

=== More general curvature ===
More generally, it is possible to define various sorts of local "curvature" on any van Kampen diagram to be - very roughly - the average excess of vertices + faces − edges (which, by Euler's formula, must total 2) and, by showing, in a particular group, that this is always non-positive (or – even better – negative) internally, show that the curvature must all be on or near the boundary and thereby try to obtain a solution of the word problem. Furthermore, one can restrict attention to diagrams that do not contain any of a set of "regions" such that there is a "smaller" region with the same boundary.

=== Other basic properties of small cancellation groups ===
- Let (∗) be a C′(1/6) presentation. Then an element g in G has order n > 1 if and only if there is a relator r in R of the form r = s^{n} in F(X) such that g is conjugate to s in G. In particular, if all elements of R are not proper powers in F(X) then G is torsion-free.
- If (∗) is a finite C′(1/6) presentation, the group G is word-hyperbolic.
- If R and S are finite symmetrized subsets of F(X) with equal normal closures in F(X) such that both presentations $\langle X\mid R\rangle$ and $\langle X\mid S\rangle$ satisfy the C′(1/6) condition then R = S.
- If a finite presentation (∗) satisfies one of C′(1/6), C′(1/4)–T(4), C(6), C(4)–T(4), C(3)–T(6) then the group G has solvable word problem and solvable conjugacy problem

== Applications ==
Examples of applications of small cancellation theory include:

- Solution of the conjugacy problem for groups of alternating knots (see and Chapter V, Theorem 8.5 in), via showing that for such knots augmented knot groups admit C(4)–T(4) presentations.
- Finitely presented C′(1/6) small cancellation groups are basic examples of word-hyperbolic groups. One of the equivalent characterizations of word-hyperbolic groups is as those admitting finite presentations where Dehn's algorithm solves the word problem.
- Finitely presented groups given by finite C(4)–T(4) presentations where every piece has length one are basic examples of CAT(0) groups: for such a presentation the universal cover of the presentation complex is a CAT(0) square complex.
- Early applications of small cancellation theory involve obtaining various embeddability results. Examples include a 1974 paper of Sacerdote and Schupp with a proof that every one-relator group with at least three generators is SQ-universal and a 1976 paper of Schupp with a proof that every countable group can be embedded into a simple group generated by an element of order two and an element of order three.
- The so-called Rips construction, due to Eliyahu Rips, provides a rich source of counter-examples regarding various subgroup properties of word-hyperbolic groups: Given an arbitrary finitely presented group Q, the construction produces a short exact sequence $1\to K\to G\to Q\to 1$ where K is two-generated and where G is torsion-free and given by a finite C′(1/6)–presentation (and thus G is word-hyperbolic). The construction yields proofs of unsolvability of several algorithmic problems for word-hyperbolic groups, including the subgroup membership problem, the generation problem and the rank problem. Also, with a few exceptions, the group K in the Rips construction is not finitely presentable. This implies that there exist word-hyperbolic groups that are not coherent that is which contain subgroups that are finitely generated but not finitely presentable.
- Small cancellation methods (for infinite presentations) were used by Ol'shanskii to construct various "monster" groups, including the Tarski monster and also to give a proof that free Burnside groups of large odd exponent are infinite (a similar result was originally proved by Adian and Novikov in 1968 using more combinatorial methods). Some other "monster" groups constructed by Ol'shanskii using this methods include: an infinite simple Noetherian group; an infinite group in which every proper subgroup has prime order and any two subgroups of the same order are conjugate; a nonamenable group where every proper subgroup is cyclic; and others.
- Bowditch used infinite small cancellation presentations to prove that there exist continuumly many quasi-isometry types of two-generator groups.
- Thomas and Velickovic used small cancellation theory to construct a finitely generated group with two non-homeomorphic asymptotic cones, thus answering a question of Gromov.
- McCammond and Wise showed how to overcome difficulties posed by the Rips construction and produce large classes of small cancellation groups that are coherent (that is where all finitely generated subgroups are finitely presented) and, moreover, locally quasiconvex (that is where all finitely generated subgroups are quasiconvex).
- Small cancellation methods play a key role in the study of various models of "generic" or "random" finitely presented groups (see). In particular, for a fixed number m ≥ 2 of generators and a fixed number t ≥ 1 of defining relations and for any λ < 1 a random m-generator t-relator group satisfies the C′(λ) small cancellation condition. Even if the number of defining relations t is not fixed but grows as (2m − 1)^{εn} (where ε ≥ 0 is the fixed density parameter in Gromov's density model of "random" groups, and where $n\to\infty$ is the length of the defining relations), then an ε-random group satisfies the C′(1/6) condition provided ε < 1/12.
- Gromov used a version of small cancellation theory with respect to a graph to prove the existence of a finitely presented group that "contains" (in the appropriate sense) an infinite sequence of expanders and therefore does not admit a uniform embedding into a Hilbert space. This result provides a direction (the only one available so far) for looking for counter-examples to the Novikov conjecture.
- Osin used a generalization of small cancellation theory to obtain an analog of Thurston's hyperbolic Dehn surgery theorem for relatively hyperbolic groups.

== Generalizations ==
- A version of small cancellation theory for quotient groups of amalgamated free products and HNN extensions was developed in the paper of Sacerdote and Schupp and then in the book of Lyndon and Schupp.
- Rips and Ol'shanskii developed a "stratified" version of small cancellation theory where the set of relators is filtered as an ascending union of strata (each stratum satisfying a small cancellation condition) and for a relator r from some stratum and a relator s from a higher stratum their overlap is required to be small with respect to |s| but is allowed to have a large with respect to |r|. This theory allowed Ol'shanskii to construct various "monster" groups including the Tarski monster and to give a new proof that free Burnside groups of large odd exponent are infinite.
- Ol'shanskii and Delzant later on developed versions of small cancellation theory for quotients of word-hyperbolic groups.
- McCammond provided a higher-dimensional version of small cancellation theory.
- McCammond and Wise pushed substantially further the basic results of the standard small cancellation theory (such as Greendlinger's lemma) regarding the geometry of van Kampen diagrams over small cancellation presentations.
- Gromov used a version of small cancellation theory with respect to a graph to prove the existence of a finitely presented group that "contains" (in the appropriate sense) an infinite sequence of expanders and therefore does not admit a uniform embedding into a Hilbert space.
- Osin gave a version of small cancellation theory for quotients of relatively hyperbolic groups and used it to obtain a relatively hyperbolic generalization of Thurston's hyperbolic Dehn surgery theorem.

== Basic references ==
- Roger Lyndon and Paul Schupp, Combinatorial group theory. Reprint of the 1977 edition. Classics in Mathematics. Springer-Verlag, Berlin, 2001. ISBN 3-540-41158-5.
- Alexander Yu. Olʹshanskii, Geometry of defining relations in groups. Translated from the 1989 Russian original by Yu. A. Bakhturin. Mathematics and its Applications (Soviet Series), 70. Kluwer Academic Publishers Group, Dordrecht, 1991. ISBN 0-7923-1394-1.
- Ralph Strebel, Appendix. Small cancellation groups. Sur les groupes hyperboliques d'après Mikhael Gromov (Bern, 1988), pp. 227–273, Progress in Mathematics, 83, Birkhäuser Boston, Boston, Massachusetts, 1990. ISBN 0-8176-3508-4.
- Milé Krajčevski, Tilings of the plane, hyperbolic groups and small cancellation conditions. Memoirs of the American Mathematical Society, vol. 154 (2001), no. 733.

== See also ==
- Geometric group theory
- Word-hyperbolic group
- Tarski monster group
- Burnside problem
- Finitely presented group
- Word problem for groups
- Van Kampen diagram
