= Free-by-cyclic group =

In group theory, especially, in geometric group theory, the class of free-by-cyclic groups have been deeply studied as important examples. A group $G$ is said to be free-by-cyclic if it has a free normal subgroup $F$ such that the quotient group $G/F$ is cyclic. In other words, $G$ is free-by-cyclic if it can be expressed as a group extension of a free group by a cyclic group (NB there are two conventions for 'by'). Usually, we assume $F$ is finitely generated and the quotient is an infinite cyclic group. Equivalently, we can define a free-by-cyclic group constructively: if $\varphi$ is an automorphism of $F$, the semidirect product $F \rtimes_\varphi \mathbb{Z}$ is a free-by-cyclic group.

An isomorphism class of a free-by-cyclic group is determined by an outer automorphism. If two automorphisms $\varphi, \psi$ represent the same outer automorphism, that is, $\varphi = \psi\iota$ for some inner automorphism $\iota$, the free-by-cyclic groups $F \rtimes_\varphi \mathbb{Z}$ and $F \rtimes_\psi \mathbb{Z}$ are isomorphic.

== Examples and results ==
The study of free-by-cyclic groups is strongly related to that of the attaching outer automorphism. Among the motivating questions are those concerning their non-positive curvature properties, such as being CAT(0).

- A free-by-cyclic group is hyperbolic, if and only if it does not contain a subgroup isomorphic to $\mathbb{Z}^2$, if and only if no nontrivial conjugacy class is left invariant by the attaching automorphism (irreducible case: Bestvina and Feighn, 1992; general case: Brinkmann, 2000).
- Hyperbolic free-by-cyclic groups are fundamental groups of compact non-positively curved cube complexes (Hagen and Wise, 2015).
- Some free-by-cyclic groups are hyperbolic relative to free-abelian subgroups. More generally, all free-by-cyclic groups are hyperbolic relative to a collection of subgroups that are free-by-cyclic for an automorphism of polynomial growth.
- Any finitely generated subgroup of a free-by-cyclic group is finitely presented (Feighn and Handel, 1999).
- The conjugacy problem for free-by-cyclic groups is solved (Bogopolski, Martino, Maslakova and Ventura, 2006). (Bridson and Groves 2010)
- Free-by-cyclic groups are conjugacy separable (Dahmani, Hughes, Kudlinska, and Touikan 2026)
- Notably, there are non-CAT(0) free-by-cyclic groups (Gersten, 1994).
- However, all free-by-cyclic groups satisfy a quadratic isoperimetric inequality (Bridson and Groves, 2010).
- All free-by-cyclic groups where the underlying free group has rank $2$ are CAT(0) (Brady, 1995).
- Many examples of free-by-cyclic groups with polynomially-growing attaching maps are known to be CAT(0).
- Free-by-cyclic groups are equationally noetherian and have well-ordered growth rates (Kudlinska and Valiunas, 2025).
