= Van Kampen diagram =

In the mathematical area of geometric group theory, a Van Kampen diagram (sometimes also called a Lyndon–Van Kampen diagram ) is a planar diagram used to represent the fact that a particular word in the generators of a group given by a group presentation represents the identity element in that group.

== History ==
The notion of a Van Kampen diagram was introduced by Egbert van Kampen in 1933. This paper appeared in the same issue of American Journal of Mathematics as another paper of Van Kampen, where he proved what is now known as the Seifert–Van Kampen theorem. The main result of the paper on Van Kampen diagrams, now known as the van Kampen lemma can be deduced from the Seifert–Van Kampen theorem by applying the latter to the presentation complex of a group. However, Van Kampen did not notice it at the time and this fact was only made explicit much later (see, e.g.). Van Kampen diagrams remained an underutilized tool in group theory for about thirty years, until the advent of the small cancellation theory in the 1960s, where Van Kampen diagrams play a central role. Currently Van Kampen diagrams are a standard tool in geometric group theory. They are used, in particular, for the study of isoperimetric functions in groups, and their various generalizations such as isodiametric functions, filling length functions, and so on.

== Formal definition ==
The definitions and notations below largely follow Lyndon and Schupp.

Let

$G=\langle A | R\, \rangle$ (†)

be a group presentation where all r∈R are cyclically reduced words in the free group F(A). The alphabet A and the set of defining relations R are often assumed to be finite, which corresponds to a finite group presentation, but this assumption is not necessary for the general definition of a Van Kampen diagram. Let R_{∗} be the symmetrized closure of R, that is, let R_{∗} be obtained from R by adding all cyclic permutations of elements of R and of their inverses.

A Van Kampen diagram over the presentation (†) is a planar finite cell complex $\mathcal D\,$, given with a specific embedding $\mathcal D\subseteq \mathbb R^2\,$ with the following additional data and satisfying the following additional properties:

1. The complex $\mathcal D\,$ is connected and simply connected.
2. Each edge (one-cell) of $\mathcal D\,$ is labelled by an arrow and a letter a∈A.
3. Some vertex (zero-cell) which belongs to the topological boundary of $\mathcal D\subseteq \mathbb R^2\,$ is specified as a base-vertex.
4. For each region (two-cell) of $\mathcal D$, for every vertex on the boundary cycle of that region, and for each of the two choices of direction (clockwise or counter-clockwise), the label of the boundary cycle of the region read from that vertex and in that direction is a freely reduced word in F(A) that belongs to R_{∗}.

Thus the 1-skeleton of $\mathcal D\,$ is a finite connected planar graph Γ embedded in $\mathbb R^2\,$ and the two-cells of $\mathcal D\,$ are precisely the bounded complementary regions for this graph.

By the choice of R_{∗} Condition 4 is equivalent to requiring that for each region of $\mathcal D\,$ there is some boundary vertex of that region and some choice of direction (clockwise or counter-clockwise) such that the boundary label of the region read from that vertex and in that direction is freely reduced and belongs to R.

A Van Kampen diagram $\mathcal D\,$ also has the boundary cycle, denoted $\partial\mathcal D\,$, which is an edge-path in the graph Γ corresponding to going around $\mathcal D\,$ once in the clockwise direction along the boundary of the unbounded complementary region of Γ, starting and ending at the base-vertex of $\mathcal D\,$. The label of that boundary cycle is a word w in the alphabet A ∪ A^{−1} (which is not necessarily freely reduced) that is called the boundary label of $\mathcal D\,$.

=== Further terminology ===
- A Van Kampen diagram $\mathcal D\,$ is called a disk diagram if $\mathcal D\,$ is a topological disk, that is, when every edge of $\mathcal D\,$ is a boundary edge of some region of $\mathcal D\,$ and when $\mathcal D\,$ has no cut-vertices.
- A Van Kampen diagram $\mathcal D\,$ is called non-reduced if there exists a reduction pair in $\mathcal D\,$, that is a pair of distinct regions of $\mathcal D\,$ such that their boundary cycles share a common edge and such that their boundary cycles, read starting from that edge, clockwise for one of the regions and counter-clockwise for the other, are equal as words in A ∪ A^{−1}. If no such pair of region exists, $\mathcal D\,$ is called reduced.
- The number of regions (two-cells) of $\mathcal D\,$ is called the area of $\mathcal D\,$ denoted ${\rm Area}(\mathcal D)\,$.

In general, a Van Kampen diagram has a "cactus-like" structure where one or more disk-components joined by (possibly degenerate) arcs, see the figure below:

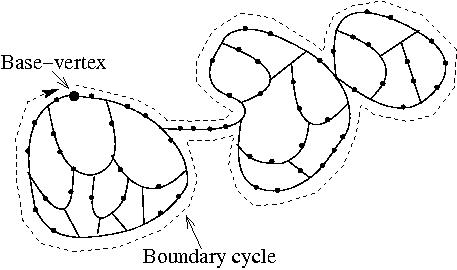

== Example ==
The following figure shows an example of a Van Kampen diagram for the free abelian group of rank two

$$G=\langle a, b| ab a^{-1}b^{-1}\rangle.$$

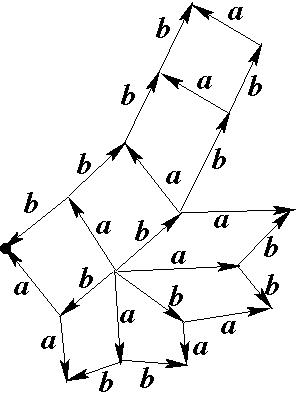

The boundary label of this diagram is the word

$$w=b^{-1}b^3a^{-1}b^{-2}ab^{-1}ba^{-1}ab^{-1}ba^{-1}a.$$

The area of this diagram is equal to 8.

== Van Kampen lemma ==
A key basic result in the theory is the so-called Van Kampen lemma which states the following:

1. Let $\mathcal D\,$ be a Van Kampen diagram over the presentation (†) with boundary label w which is a word (not necessarily freely reduced) in the alphabet A ∪ A^{−1}. Then w=1 in G.
2. Let w be a freely reduced word in the alphabet A ∪ A^{−1} such that w=1 in G. Then there exists a reduced Van Kampen diagram $\mathcal D\,$ over the presentation (†) whose boundary label is freely reduced and is equal to w.

=== Sketch of the proof ===
First observe that for an element w ∈ F(A) we have w = 1 in G if and only if w belongs to the normal closure of R in F(A) that is, if and only if w can be represented as

$w=u_1s_1u_1^{-1}\cdots u_n s_nu_{n}^{-1} \text{ in } F(A),$ (♠)

where n ≥ 0 and where s_{i} ∈ R_{∗} for i = 1, ..., n.

Part 1 of Van Kampen's lemma is proved by induction on the area of $\mathcal D\,$. The inductive step consists in "peeling" off one of the boundary regions of $\mathcal D\,$ to get a Van Kampen diagram $\mathcal D'\,$ with boundary cycle w and observing that in F(A) we have

$$w=usu^{-1} w',\,$$

where s∈R_{∗} is the boundary cycle of the region that was removed to get $\mathcal D'\,$ from $\mathcal D\,$.

The proof of part two of Van Kampen's lemma is more involved. First, it is easy to see that if w is freely reduced and w = 1 in G there exists some Van Kampen diagram $\mathcal D_0\,$ with boundary label w_{0} such that w = w_{0} in F(A) (after possibly freely reducing w_{0}). Namely consider a representation of w of the form (♠) above. Then make $\mathcal D_0\,$ to be a wedge of n "lollipops" with "stems" labeled by u_{i} and with the "candys" (2-cells) labelled by s_{i}. Then the boundary label of $\mathcal D_0\,$ is a word w_{0} such that w = w_{0} in F(A). However, it is possible that the word w_{0} is not freely reduced. One then starts performing "folding" moves to get a sequence of Van Kampen diagrams $\mathcal D_0, \mathcal D_1, \mathcal D_2,\dots\,$ by making their boundary labels more and more freely reduced and making sure that at each step the boundary label of each diagram in the sequence is equal to w in F(A). The sequence terminates in a finite number of steps with a Van Kampen diagram $\mathcal D_k\,$ whose boundary label is freely reduced and thus equal to w as a word. The diagram $\mathcal D_k\,$ may not be reduced. If that happens, we can remove the reduction pairs from this diagram by a simple surgery operation without affecting the boundary label. Eventually this produces a reduced Van Kampen diagram $\mathcal D\,$ whose boundary cycle is freely reduced and equal to w.

=== Strengthened version of Van Kampen's lemma ===
Moreover, the above proof shows that the conclusion of Van Kampen's lemma can be strengthened as follows. Part 1 can be strengthened to say that if $\mathcal D\,$ is a Van Kampen diagram of area n with boundary label w then there exists a representation (♠) for w as a product in F(A) of exactly n conjugates of elements of R_{∗}. Part 2 can be strengthened to say that if w is freely reduced and admits a representation (♠) as a product in F(A) of n conjugates of elements of R_{∗} then there exists a reduced Van Kampen diagram with boundary label w and of area at most n.

== Dehn functions and isoperimetric functions ==
=== Area of a word representing the identity ===
Let w ∈ F(A) be such that w = 1 in G. Then the area of w, denoted Area(w), is defined as the minimum of the areas of all Van Kampen diagrams with boundary labels w (Van Kampen's lemma says that at least one such diagram exists).

One can show that the area of w can be equivalently defined as the smallest n≥0 such that there exists a representation (♠) expressing w as a product in F(A) of n conjugates of the defining relators.

=== Isoperimetric functions and Dehn functions ===
A nonnegative monotone nondecreasing function f(n) is said to be an isoperimetric function for presentation (†) if for every freely reduced word w such that w = 1 in G we have

$${\rm Area}(w)\le f(|w|),$$

where |w| is the length of the word w.

Suppose now that the alphabet A in (†) is finite. Then the Dehn function of (†) is defined as

$${\rm Dehn}(n)=\max\{{\rm Area}(w): w=1 \text{ in } G, |w|\le n, w \text{ freely reduced}.\}$$

It is easy to see that Dehn(n) is an isoperimetric function for (†) and, moreover, if f(n) is any other isoperimetric function for (†) then Dehn(n) ≤ f(n) for every n ≥ 0.

Let w ∈ F(A) be a freely reduced word such that w = 1 in G. A Van Kampen diagram $\mathcal D\,$ with boundary label w is called minimal if ${\rm Area}(\mathcal D)={\rm Area}(w).$ Minimal Van Kampen diagrams are discrete analogues of minimal surfaces in Riemannian geometry.

== Generalizations and other applications ==
- There are several generalizations of van-Kampen diagrams where instead of being planar, connected and simply connected (which means being homotopically equivalent to a disk) the diagram is drawn on or homotopically equivalent to some other surface. It turns out, that there is a close connection between the geometry of the surface and certain group theoretical notions. A particularly important one of these is the notion of an annular Van Kampen diagram, which is homotopically equivalent to an annulus. Annular diagrams, also known as conjugacy diagrams, can be used to represent conjugacy in groups given by group presentations. Also spherical Van Kampen diagrams are related to several versions of group-theoretic asphericity and to Whitehead's asphericity conjecture, Van Kampen diagrams on the torus are related to commuting elements, diagrams on the real projective plane are related to involutions in the group and diagrams on Klein's bottle are related to elements that are conjugated to their own inverse.
- Van Kampen diagrams are central objects in the small cancellation theory developed by Greendlinger, Lyndon and Schupp in the 1960s-1970s. Small cancellation theory deals with group presentations where the defining relations have "small overlaps" with each other. This condition is reflected in the geometry of reduced Van Kampen diagrams over small cancellation presentations, forcing certain kinds of non-positively curved or negatively curved behavior. This behavior yields useful information about algebraic and algorithmic properties of small cancellation groups, in particular regarding the word and the conjugacy problems. Small cancellation theory was one of the key precursors of geometric group theory, that emerged as a distinct mathematical area in the late 1980s and it remains an important part of geometric group theory.
- Van Kampen diagrams play a key role in the theory of word-hyperbolic groups introduced by Gromov in 1987. In particular, it turns out that a finitely presented group is word-hyperbolic if and only if it satisfies a linear isoperimetric inequality. Moreover, there is an isoperimetric gap in the possible spectrum of isoperimetric functions for finitely presented groups: for any finitely presented group either it is hyperbolic and satisfies a linear isoperimetric inequality or else the Dehn function is at least quadratic.
- The study of isoperimetric functions for finitely presented groups has become an important general theme in geometric group theory where substantial progress has occurred. Much work has gone into constructing groups with "fractional" Dehn functions (that is, with Dehn functions being polynomials of non-integer degree). The work of Rips, Ol'shanskii, Birget and Sapir explored the connections between Dehn functions and time complexity functions of Turing machines and showed that an arbitrary "reasonable" time function can be realized (up to appropriate equivalence) as the Dehn function of some finitely presented group.
- Various stratified and relativized versions of Van Kampen diagrams have been explored in the subject as well. In particular, a stratified version of small cancellation theory, developed by Ol'shanskii, resulted in constructions of various group-theoretic "monsters", such as the Tarski Monster, and in geometric solutions of the Burnside problem for periodic groups of large exponent. Relative versions of Van Kampen diagrams (with respect to a collection of subgroups) were used by Osin to develop an isoperimetric function approach to the theory of relatively hyperbolic groups.

== See also ==
- Geometric group theory
- Presentation of a group
- Seifert–Van Kampen theorem

== Basic references ==
- Alexander Yu. Ol'shanskii. Geometry of defining relations in groups. Translated from the 1989 Russian original by Yu. A. Bakhturin. Mathematics and its Applications (Soviet Series), 70. Kluwer Academic Publishers Group, Dordrecht, 1991. ISBN 0-7923-1394-1
- Roger C. Lyndon and Paul E. Schupp. Combinatorial Group Theory. Springer-Verlag, New York, 2001. "Classics in Mathematics" series, reprint of the 1977 edition. ISBN 978-3-540-41158-1; Ch. V. Small Cancellation Theory. pp. 235–294.
