= Garside element =

Element of algebraic structure

In mathematics, a Garside element is an element of an algebraic structure such as a monoid that has several desirable properties.

Formally, if M is a monoid, then an element Δ of M is said to be a Garside element if the set of all right divisors of Δ,
$$\{ r \in M \mid \text{for some } x \in M, \Delta = x r \},$$
is the same set as the set of all left divisors of Δ,
$$\{ \ell \in M \mid \text{for some } x \in M, \Delta = \ell x \},$$
and this set generates M.

A Garside element is in general not unique: any power of a Garside element is again a Garside element.

== Garside monoid and Garside group ==
A Garside monoid is a monoid with the following properties:

- Finitely generated and atomic;
- Cancellative;
- The partial order relations of divisibility are lattices;
- There exists a Garside element.

A Garside monoid satisfies the Ore condition for multiplicative sets and hence embeds in its group of fractions: such a group is a Garside group. A Garside group is biautomatic and hence has solvable word problem and conjugacy problem. Examples of such groups include braid groups and, more generally, Artin groups of finite Coxeter type.

The name was coined by Patrick Dehornoy and Luis Paris to mark the work on the conjugacy problem for braid groups of Frank Arnold Garside (1915–1988), a teacher at Magdalen College School, Oxford who served as Lord Mayor of Oxford in 1984–1985.
