= Artin–Tits group =

Family of infinite discrete groups

In the mathematical area of group theory, Artin groups, also known as Artin–Tits groups or generalized braid groups, are a family of infinite discrete groups defined by simple presentations. They are closely related with Coxeter groups. Examples are free groups, free abelian groups, braid groups, and right-angled Artin–Tits groups, among others.

The groups are named after Emil Artin, due to his early work on braid groups in the 1920s to 1940s, and Jacques Tits who developed the theory of a more general class of groups in the 1960s.

== Definition ==
An Artin–Tits presentation is a group presentation $\langle S \mid R \rangle$ where $S$ is a (usually finite) set of generators and $R$ is a set of Artin–Tits relations, namely relations of the form $stst\ldots = tsts\ldots$ for distinct $s, t$ in $S$, where both sides have equal lengths, and there exists at most one relation for each pair of distinct generators $s, t$. An Artin–Tits group is a group that admits an Artin–Tits presentation. Likewise, an Artin–Tits monoid is a monoid that, as a monoid, admits an Artin–Tits presentation.

Alternatively, an Artin–Tits group can be specified by the set of generators $S$ and, for every $s, t$ in $S$, the natural number $m_{s,t} \geqslant 2$ that is the length of the words $stst\ldots$ and $tsts\ldots$ such that $stst\ldots = tsts\ldots$ is the relation connecting $s$ and $t$, if any. By convention, one puts $m_{s,t} = \infty$ when there is no relation $stst\ldots = tsts\ldots$ . Formally, if we define $\langle s, t \rangle^m$ to denote an alternating product of $s$ and $t$ of length $m$, beginning with $s$ — so that $\langle s, t \rangle^2 = st$, $\langle s, t \rangle^3 = sts$, etc. — the Artin–Tits relations take the form

$$\langle s, t \rangle^{m_{s,t}} = \langle t, s \rangle^{m_{t, s}}, \text{ where } m_{s, t} = m_{t, s} \in \{2,3,\ldots, \infty\}.$$

The integers $m_{s, t}$ can be organized into a symmetric matrix, known as the Coxeter matrix of the group.

If $\langle S \mid R\rangle$ is an Artin–Tits presentation of an Artin–Tits group $A$, the quotient of $A$ obtained by adding the relation $s^2 = 1$ for each $s$ of $R$ is a Coxeter group. Conversely, if $W$ is a Coxeter group presented by reflections and the relations $s^2 = 1$ are removed, the extension thus obtained is an Artin–Tits group. For instance, the Coxeter group associated with the $n$-strand braid group is the symmetric group of all permutations of $\{1, \ldots, n\}$.

== Examples ==
- $G = \langle S \mid \emptyset\rangle$ is the free group based on $S$; here $m_{s,t} = \infty$ for all $s, t$.
- $G = \langle S \mid \{st=ts \mid s, t \in S\} \rangle$ is the free abelian group based on $S$; here $m_{s,t} = 2$ for all $s, t$.
- $G = \langle \sigma_1, \ldots, \sigma_{n-1} \mid \sigma_i\sigma_j\sigma_i = \sigma_j\sigma_i\sigma_j \text{ for } \vert i - j\vert = 1, \sigma_i \sigma_j = \sigma_j\sigma_i \text{ for } \vert i - j\vert \geqslant 2 \rangle$ is the braid group on $n$ strands; here $m_{\sigma_i,\sigma_j} = 3$ for $\vert i - j\vert = 1$, and $m_{\sigma_i,\sigma_j} = 2$ for $\vert i - j\vert > 1$.

== General properties ==
Artin–Tits monoids are eligible for Garside methods based on the investigation of their divisibility relations, and are well understood:

- Artin–Tits monoids are cancellative, and they admit greatest common divisors and conditional least common multiples (a least common multiple exists whenever a common multiple does).
- If $A^+$ is an Artin–Tits monoid, and if $W$ is the associated Coxeter group, there is a (set-theoretic) section $\sigma$ of $W$ into $A^+$, and every element of $A^+$ admits a distinguished decomposition as a sequence of elements in the image of $\sigma$ ("greedy normal form").

Very few results are known for general Artin–Tits groups. In particular, the following basic questions remain open in the general case:

– solving the word and conjugacy problems — which are conjectured to be decidable,

– determining torsion — which is conjectured to be trivial,

– determining the center — which is conjectured to be trivial or monogenic in the case when the group is not a direct product ("irreducible case"),

– determining the cohomology — in particular solving the $K(\pi, 1)$ conjecture, i.e., finding an acyclic complex whose fundamental group is the considered group.

Partial results involving particular subfamilies are gathered below. Among the few known general results, one can mention:

- Artin–Tits groups are infinite countable.
- In an Artin–Tits group $\langle S \mid R\rangle$, the only relation connecting the squares of the elements $s, t$ of $S$ is $s^2t^2 = t^2s^2$ if $st = ts$ is in $R$ (John Crisp and Luis Paris).
- For every Artin–Tits presentation $\langle S \mid R\rangle$, the Artin–Tits monoid presented by $\langle S \mid R\rangle$ embeds in the Artin–Tits group presented by $\langle S \mid R\rangle$ (Paris).
- Every (finitely generated) Artin–Tits monoid admits a finite Garside family (Matthew Dyer and Christophe Hohlweg). As a consequence, the existence of common right-multiples in Artin–Tits monoids is decidable, and reduction of multifractions is effective.

== Particular classes of Artin–Tits groups ==
Several important classes of Artin groups can be defined in terms of the properties of the Coxeter matrix.

=== Artin–Tits groups of spherical type ===
- An Artin–Tits group is said to be of spherical type if the associated Coxeter group $W$ is finite — the alternative terminology "Artin–Tits group of finite type" is to be avoided, because of its ambiguity: a "finite type group" is just one that admits a finite generating set. Recall that a complete classification is known, the 'irreducible types' being labeled as the infinite series $A_n$, $B_n$, $D_n$, $I_2(n)$ and six exceptional groups $E_6$, $E_7$, $E_8$, $F_4$, $H_3$, and $H_4$.
- In the case of a spherical Artin–Tits group, the group is a group of fractions for the monoid, making the study much easier. Every above-mentioned problem is solved in the positive for spherical Artin–Tits groups: the word and conjugacy problems are decidable, their torsion is trivial, the center is monogenic in the irreducible case, and the cohomology is determined (Pierre Deligne, by geometrical methods, Egbert Brieskorn and Kyoji Saito, by combinatorial methods).
- A pure Artin–Tits group of spherical type can be realized as the fundamental group of the complement of a finite hyperplane arrangement in $\Complex^n$.
- Artin–Tits groups of spherical type are biautomatic groups (Ruth Charney).
- In modern terminology, an Artin–Tits group $A$ is a Garside group, meaning that $A$ is a group of fractions for the associated monoid $A^+$ and there exists for each element of $A$ a unique normal form that consists of a finite sequence of (copies of) elements of $W$ and their inverses ("symmetric greedy normal form")

=== Right-angled Artin groups ===
- An Artin–Tits group is said to be right-angled if all coefficients of the Coxeter matrix are either $2$ or $\infty$, i.e., all relations are commutation relations $st = ts$. The names (free) partially commutative group, graph group, trace group, semifree group or even locally free group are also common.
- For this class of Artin–Tits groups, a different labeling scheme is commonly used. Any graph $\Gamma$ on $n$ vertices labeled $1, 2, \ldots, n$ defines a matrix $M$, for which $m_{s, t} = 2$ if the vertices $s$ and $t$ are connected by an edge in $\Gamma$, and $m_{s, t} = \infty$ otherwise.
- The class of right-angled Artin–Tits groups includes the free groups of finite rank, corresponding to a graph with no edges, and the finitely-generated free abelian groups, corresponding to a complete graph. Every right-angled Artin group of rank r can be constructed as HNN extension of a right-angled Artin group of rank $r - 1$, with the free product and direct product as the extreme cases. A generalization of this construction is called a graph product of groups. A right-angled Artin group is a special case of this product, with every vertex/operand of the graph-product being a free group of rank one (the infinite cyclic group).
- The word and conjugacy problems of a right-angled Artin–Tits group are decidable, the former in linear time, the group is torsion-free, and there is an explicit cellular finite $K(\pi, 1)$ (John Crisp, Eddy Godelle, and Bert Wiest).
- Every right-angled Artin–Tits group acts freely and cocompactly on a finite-dimensional CAT(0) cube complex, its "Salvetti complex". As an application, one can use right-angled Artin groups and their Salvetti complexes to construct groups with given finiteness properties (Mladen Bestvina and Noel Brady) see also (Ian Leary).

=== Artin–Tits groups of large type ===
- An Artin–Tits group (and a Coxeter group) is said to be of large type if $m_{s, t} \geqslant 3$ for all generators $s \neq t$; it is said to be of extra-large type if $m_{s, t} \geqslant 4$ for all generators $s \neq t$.
- Artin–Tits groups of extra-large type are eligible for small cancellation theory. As an application, Artin–Tits groups of extra-large type are torsion-free and have solvable conjugacy problem (Kenneth Appel and Paul Schupp).
- Artin–Tits groups of extra-large type are biautomatic (David Peifer).
- Artin groups of large type are shortlex automatic with regular geodesics (Derek Holt and Sarah Rees).

=== Other types ===
Many other families of Artin–Tits groups have been identified and investigated. Here we mention two of them.

- An Artin–Tits group $\langle S \mid R \rangle$ is said to be of FC type ("flag complex") if, for every subset $S'$ of $S$ such that $m_{s, t} \neq \infty$ for all $s, t$ in $S'$, the group $\langle S' \mid R \cap S'{}^2 \rangle$ is of spherical type. Such groups act cocompactly on a CAT(0) cubical complex, and, as a consequence, one can find a rational normal form for their elements and deduce a solution to the word problem (Joe Altobelli and Charney). An alternative normal form is provided by multifraction reduction, which gives a unique expression by an irreducible multifraction directly extending the expression by an irreducible fraction in the spherical case (Dehornoy).
- An Artin–Tits group is said to be of affine type if the associated Coxeter group is affine. They correspond to the extended Dynkin diagrams of the four infinite families $\widetilde{A}_n$ for $n \geqslant 1$, $\widetilde{B}_n$, $\widetilde{C}_n$ for $n \geqslant 2$, and $\widetilde{D}_n$ for $n \geqslant 3$, and of the five sporadic types $\widetilde{E}_6$, $\widetilde{E}_7$, $\widetilde{E}_8$, $\widetilde{F}_4$, and $\widetilde{G}_2$. Affine Artin–Tits groups are of Euclidean type: the associated Coxeter group acts geometrically on a Euclidean space. As a consequence, their center is trivial, and their word problem is decidable (Jon McCammond and Robert Sulway). In 2019, a proof of the $K(\pi, 1)$ conjecture was announced for all affine Artin–Tits groups (Mario Salvetti and Giovanni Paolini).

== See also ==
- Free partially commutative monoid
- Artinian group (an unrelated notion)
- Non-commutative cryptography
- Elementary abelian group
