= Automatic semigroup =

Mathematical structure

In mathematics, an automatic semigroup is a finitely generated semigroup equipped with several regular languages over an alphabet representing a generating set. One of these languages determines "canonical forms" for the elements of the semigroup, the other languages determine if two canonical forms represent elements that differ by multiplication by a generator.

Formally, let $S$ be a semigroup and $A$ be a finite set of generators. Then an automatic structure for $S$ with respect to $A$ consists of a regular language $L$ over $A$ such that every element of $S$ has at least one representative in $L$ and such that for each $a \in A \cup \{\varepsilon\}$, the relation consisting of pairs $(u,v)$ with $ua = v$ is regular, viewed as a subset of (A^{#} × A^{#})*. Here A^{#} is A augmented with a padding symbol.

The concept of an automatic semigroup was generalized from automatic groups by Campbell et al. (2001)

Unlike automatic groups (see Epstein et al. 1992), a semigroup may have an automatic structure with respect to one generating set, but not with respect to another. However, if an automatic semigroup has an identity, then it has an automatic structure with respect to any generating set (Duncan et al. 1999).

== Decision problems ==
Like automatic groups, automatic semigroups have word problem solvable in quadratic time. Kambites & Otto (2006) showed that it is undecidable whether an element of an automatic monoid possesses a right inverse.

Cain (2006) proved that both cancellativity and left-cancellativity are undecidable for automatic semigroups. On the other hand, right-cancellativity is decidable for automatic semigroups (Silva & Steinberg 2004).

== Geometric characterization ==
Automatic structures for groups have an elegant geometric characterization called the fellow traveller property (Epstein et al. 1992, ch. 2). Automatic structures for semigroups possess the fellow traveller property but are not in general characterized by it (Campbell et al. 2001). However, the characterization can be generalized to certain 'group-like' classes of semigroups, notably completely simple semigroups (Campbell et al. 2002) and group-embeddable semigroups (Cain et al. 2006).

== Examples of automatic semigroups ==
- Bicyclic monoid
- Finitely generated subsemigroups of a free semigroup
