= Geometric group theory =

Area in mathematics devoted to the study of finitely generated groups

The Cayley graph of a free group with two generators. This is a hyperbolic group whose Gromov boundary is a Cantor set. Hyperbolic groups and their boundaries are important topics in geometric group theory, as are Cayley graphs.

Geometric group theory is an area in mathematics devoted to the study of finitely generated groups by exploring the connections between algebraic properties of such groups and topological and geometric properties of spaces on which these groups can act non-trivially (that is, when the groups in question are realized as geometric symmetries or continuous transformations of some spaces).

An important idea in geometric group theory is to consider finitely generated groups themselves as geometric objects. This is usually done by studying the Cayley graphs of groups, which, in addition to the graph structure, are endowed with the structure of a metric space, given by the so-called word metric.

Geometric group theory, as a distinct area, is relatively new, and became a clearly identifiable branch of mathematics in the late 1980s and early 1990s. Geometric group theory closely interacts with low-dimensional topology, hyperbolic geometry, algebraic topology, computational group theory and differential geometry. There are also substantial connections with complexity theory, mathematical logic, the study of Lie groups and their discrete subgroups, dynamical systems, probability theory, K-theory, and other areas of mathematics.

== History ==
One of my personal beliefs is that fascination with symmetries and groups is one way of coping with frustrations of life's limitations: we like to recognize symmetries which allow us to recognize more than what we can see. In this sense the study of geometric group theory is a part of culture, and reminds me of several things [...] such as teaching mathematics, reciting Mallarmé, or greeting a friend.

— de la Harpe (2000, p. 3)

Geometric group theory grew out of combinatorial group theory, which largely studied properties of discrete groups by analyzing group presentations (ways of describing groups as quotients of free groups); this field was first systematically studied in the early 1880s by Walther von Dyck, a student of Felix Klein. A precursor is found in the 1856 icosian calculus of William Rowan Hamilton, who studied the icosahedral symmetry group via the edge graph of the dodecahedron. Currently, combinatorial group theory as a discipline is largely subsumed by geometric group theory. Moreover, the term "geometric group theory" came to often include studying discrete groups using probabilistic, measure-theoretic, arithmetic and analytic approaches that lie outside of the traditional combinatorial group theory arsenal.

In the first half of the 20th century, pioneering work of Max Dehn, Jakob Nielsen, Kurt Reidemeister, Otto Schreier, J. H. C. Whitehead, and Egbert van Kampen, among others, introduced topological and geometric ideas into the study of discrete groups. Other precursors of geometric group theory include small cancellation theory and Bass–Serre theory. Small cancellation theory was introduced by Martin Greendlinger in the 1960s and further developed by Roger Lyndon and Paul Schupp. It studies van Kampen diagrams, corresponding to finite group presentations, via combinatorial curvature conditions and derives algebraic and algorithmic properties of groups from such analysis. Bass–Serre theory, introduced by Jean-Pierre Serre in the 1970s, derives structural algebraic information about groups by studying group actions on simplicial trees. External precursors of geometric group theory include the study of lattices in Lie groups, especially Mostow's rigidity theorem, the study of Kleinian groups, and the progress achieved in low-dimensional topology and hyperbolic geometry in the 1970s and early 1980s, spurred, in particular, by William Thurston's geometrization program.

The emergence of geometric group theory as a distinct area of mathematics is usually traced to the late 1980s and early 1990s. It was spurred by the Mikhail Gromov's 1987 monograph "Hyperbolic groups" that introduced the notion of a hyperbolic group (also known as word-hyperbolic or Gromov-hyperbolic or negatively curved group), which captures the idea of a finitely generated group having large-scale negative curvature, and by his subsequent monograph Asymptotic Invariants of Infinite Groups that outlined his program of understanding discrete groups up to quasi-isometry. Gromov's work had a transformative effect on the study of discrete groups and the phrase "geometric group theory" started appearing soon afterwards. (see e.g.).

== Modern themes and developments ==
Notable themes and developments in geometric group theory in 1990s and 2000s include:

- Gromov's program to study quasi-isometric properties of groups.

A particularly influential broad theme in the area is Gromov's program of classifying finitely generated groups according to their large scale geometry. Formally, this means classifying finitely generated groups with their word metric up to quasi-isometry. This program involves:
1. The study of properties that are invariant under quasi-isometry. Examples of such properties of finitely generated groups include: the growth rate of a finitely generated group; the isoperimetric function or Dehn function of a finitely presented group; the number of ends of a group; hyperbolicity of a group; the homeomorphism type of the Gromov boundary of a hyperbolic group; asymptotic cones of finitely generated groups (see e.g.); amenability of a finitely generated group; being virtually abelian (that is, having an abelian subgroup of finite index); being virtually nilpotent; being virtually free; being finitely presentable; being a finitely presentable group with solvable Word Problem; and others.
2. Theorems which use quasi-isometry invariants to prove algebraic results about groups, for example: Gromov's polynomial growth theorem; Stallings' ends theorem; Mostow rigidity theorem.
3. Quasi-isometric rigidity theorems, in which one classifies algebraically all groups that are quasi-isometric to some given group or metric space. This direction was initiated by the work of Schwartz on quasi-isometric rigidity of rank-one lattices and the work of Benson Farb and Lee Mosher on quasi-isometric rigidity of Baumslag–Solitar groups.

- The theory of word-hyperbolic and relatively hyperbolic groups. A particularly important development here is the work of Zlil Sela in 1990s resulting in the solution of the isomorphism problem for word-hyperbolic groups. The notion of a relatively hyperbolic groups was originally introduced by Gromov in 1987 and refined by Farb and Brian Bowditch, in the 1990s. The study of relatively hyperbolic groups gained prominence in the 2000s.
- Interactions with mathematical logic and the study of the first-order theory of free groups. Particularly important progress occurred on the famous Tarski conjectures, due to the work of Sela as well as of Olga Kharlampovich and Alexei Myasnikov. The study of limit groups and introduction of the language and machinery of non-commutative algebraic geometry gained prominence.
- Interactions with computer science, complexity theory and the theory of formal languages. This theme is exemplified by the development of the theory of automatic groups, a notion that imposes certain geometric and language theoretic conditions on the multiplication operation in a finitely generated group.
- The study of isoperimetric inequalities, Dehn functions and their generalizations for finitely presented group. This includes, in particular, the work of Jean-Camille Birget, Aleksandr Olʹshanskiĭ, Eliyahu Rips and Mark Sapir essentially characterizing the possible Dehn functions of finitely presented groups, as well as results providing explicit constructions of groups with fractional Dehn functions.
- The theory of toral or JSJ-decompositions for 3-manifolds was originally brought into a group theoretic setting by Peter Kropholler. This notion has been developed by many authors for both finitely presented and finitely generated groups.
- Connections with geometric analysis, the study of C*-algebras associated with discrete groups and of the theory of free probability. This theme is represented, in particular, by considerable progress on the Novikov conjecture and the Baum–Connes conjecture and the development and study of related group-theoretic notions such as topological amenability, asymptotic dimension, uniform embeddability into Hilbert spaces, rapid decay property, and so on (see e.g.).
- Interactions with the theory of quasiconformal analysis on metric spaces, particularly in relation to Cannon's conjecture about characterization of hyperbolic groups with Gromov boundary homeomorphic to the 2-sphere.
- Finite subdivision rules, also in relation to Cannon's conjecture.
- Interactions with topological dynamics in the contexts of studying actions of discrete groups on various compact spaces and group compactifications, particularly convergence group methods
- Development of the theory of group actions on $\mathbb R$-trees (particularly the Rips machine), and its applications.
- The study of group actions on CAT(0) spaces and CAT(0) cubical complexes, motivated by ideas from Alexandrov geometry.
- Interactions with low-dimensional topology and hyperbolic geometry, particularly the study of 3-manifold groups, mapping class groups of surfaces, braid groups and Kleinian groups.
- Introduction of probabilistic methods to study algebraic properties of "random" group theoretic objects (groups, group elements, subgroups, etc.). A particularly important development here is the work of Gromov who used probabilistic methods to prove the existence of a finitely generated group that is not uniformly embeddable into a Hilbert space. Other notable developments include introduction and study of the notion of generic-case complexity for group-theoretic and other mathematical algorithms and algebraic rigidity results for generic groups.
- The study of automata groups and iterated monodromy groups as groups of automorphisms of infinite rooted trees. In particular, Grigorchuk's groups of intermediate growth, and their generalizations, appear in this context.
- The study of measure-theoretic properties of group actions on measure spaces, particularly introduction and development of the notions of measure equivalence and orbit equivalence, as well as measure-theoretic generalizations of Mostow rigidity.
- The study of unitary representations of discrete groups and Kazhdan's property (T)
- The study of Out(F_{n}) (the outer automorphism group of a free group of rank n) and of individual automorphisms of free groups. Introduction and the study of Culler-Vogtmann's outer space and of the theory of train tracks for free group automorphisms played a particularly prominent role here.
- Development of Bass–Serre theory, particularly various accessibility results and the theory of tree lattices. Generalizations of Bass–Serre theory such as the theory of complexes of groups.
- The study of random walks on groups and related boundary theory, particularly the notion of Poisson boundary (see e.g.). The study of amenability and of groups whose amenability status is still unknown.
- Interactions with finite group theory, particularly progress in the study of subgroup growth.
- Studying subgroups and lattices in linear groups, such as $SL(n, \mathbb R)$, and of other Lie groups, via geometric methods (e.g. buildings), algebro-geometric tools (e.g. algebraic groups and representation varieties), analytic methods (e.g. unitary representations on Hilbert spaces) and arithmetic methods.
- Group cohomology, using algebraic and topological methods, particularly involving interaction with algebraic topology and the use of morse-theoretic ideas in the combinatorial context; large-scale, or coarse (see e.g.) homological and cohomological methods.
- Progress on traditional combinatorial group theory topics, such as the Burnside problem, the study of Coxeter groups and Artin groups, and so on (the methods used to study these questions currently are often geometric and topological).

== Examples ==
The following examples are often studied in geometric group theory:

- Amenable groups
- Free Burnside groups
- The infinite cyclic group Z
- Free groups
- Free products
- Outer automorphism groups Out(F_{n}) (via outer space)
- Free-by-cyclic groups
- One-relator groups
- Hyperbolic groups
- Mapping class groups (automorphisms of surfaces)
- Symmetric groups
- Braid groups
- Coxeter groups
- General Artin groups
- Thompson's groups F, T, and V
- CAT(0) groups
- Arithmetic groups
- Automatic groups
- Fuchsian groups, Kleinian groups, and other groups acting properly discontinuously on symmetric spaces, in particular lattices in semisimple Lie groups.
- Wallpaper groups and crystallographic groups more generally
- Baumslag–Solitar groups
- Fundamental groups of graphs of groups
- Grigorchuk group

== See also ==
- The ping-pong lemma, a useful way to exhibit a group as a free product
- Amenable group
- Nielsen transformation
- Tietze transformation
