= Finiteness properties of groups =

Mathematical property

In mathematics, finiteness properties of a group are a collection of properties that allow the use of various algebraic and topological tools, for example group cohomology, to study the group. It is mostly of interest for the study of infinite groups.

Special cases of groups with finiteness properties are finitely generated and finitely presented groups.

== Topological finiteness properties ==
Given an integer n ≥ 1, a group $\Gamma$ is said to be of type F_{n} if there exists an aspherical CW-complex whose fundamental group is isomorphic to $\Gamma$ (a classifying space for $\Gamma$) and whose n-skeleton is finite. A group is said to be of type F_{∞} if it is of type F_{n} for every n. It is of type F if there exists a finite aspherical CW-complex of which it is the fundamental group.

For small values of n these conditions have more classical interpretations:

- a group is of type F_{1} if and only if it is finitely generated (the rose with petals indexed by a finite generating family is the 1-skeleton of a classifying space, the Cayley graph of the group for this generating family is the 1-skeleton of its universal cover);
- a group is of type F_{2} if and only if it is finitely presented (the presentation complex, i.e. the rose with petals indexed by a finite generating set and 2-cells corresponding to each relation, is the 2-skeleton of a classifying space, whose universal cover has the Cayley complex as its 2-skeleton).

It is known that for every n ≥ 1 there are groups of type F_{n} which are not of type F_{n+1}. Finite groups are of type F_{∞} but not of type F. Thompson's group $F$ is an example of a torsion-free group which is of type F_{∞} but not of type F.

A reformulation of the F_{n} property is that a group has it if and only if it acts properly discontinuously, freely and cocompactly on a CW-complex whose homotopy groups $\pi_0, \ldots, \pi_{n-1}$ vanish. Another finiteness property can be formulated by replacing homotopy with homology: a group is said to be of type FH_{n} if it acts as above on a CW-complex whose n first homology groups vanish.

== Algebraic finiteness properties ==
Let $\Gamma$ be a group and $\mathbb Z\Gamma$ its group ring. The group $\Gamma$ is said to be of type FP_{n} if there exists a resolution of the trivial $\mathbb Z\Gamma$-module $\mathbb Z$ such that the n first terms are finitely generated projective $\mathbb Z\Gamma$-modules. The types FP_{∞} and FP are defined in the obvious way.

The same statement with projective modules replaced by free modules defines the classes FL_{n} for n ≥ 1, FL_{∞} and FL.

It is also possible to define classes FP_{n}(R) and FL_{n}(R) for any commutative ring R, by replacing the group ring $\mathbb Z\Gamma$ by $R\Gamma$ in the definitions above.

Either of the conditions F_{n} or FH_{n} imply FP_{n} and FL_{n} (over any commutative ring). A group is of type FP_{1} if and only if it is finitely generated, but for any n ≥ 2 there exists groups which are of type FP_{n} but not F_{n}.

If a group is of type F_{2} and FP_{n}, then it is of type F_{n}.

== Group cohomology ==
If a group is of type FP_{n} then its cohomology groups $H^i(\Gamma)$ are finitely generated for $0 \le i \le n$. If it is of type FP then it is of finite cohomological dimension. Thus finiteness properties play an important role in the cohomology theory of groups.

== Examples ==
=== Finite groups ===
A finite cyclic group $G$ acts freely on the unit sphere in $\mathbb R^{\mathbb N}$, preserving a CW-complex structure with finitely many cells in each dimension. Since this unit sphere is contractible, every finite cyclic group is of type F_{∞}.

The standard resolution for a group $G$ gives rise to a contractible CW-complex with a free $G$-action in which the cells of dimension $n$ correspond to $(n+1)$-tuples of elements of $G$. This shows that every finite group is of type F_{∞}.

A non-trivial finite group is never of type F because it has infinite cohomological dimension. This also implies that a group with a non-trivial torsion subgroup is never of type F.

=== Nilpotent groups ===
If $\Gamma$ is a torsion-free, finitely generated nilpotent group then it is of type F.

=== Geometric conditions for finiteness properties ===
Negatively curved groups (hyperbolic or CAT(0) groups) are always of type F_{∞}. Such a group is of type F if and only if it is torsion-free.

As an example, cocompact S-arithmetic groups in algebraic groups over number fields are of type F_{∞}. The Borel–Serre compactification shows that this is also the case for non-cocompact arithmetic groups.

Arithmetic groups over function fields have very different finiteness properties: if $\Gamma$ is an arithmetic group in a simple algebraic group of rank $r$ over a global function field (such as $\mathbb F_q(t)$) then it is of type F_{r} but not of type F_{r+1}.
