= Egbert van Kampen =

Dutch mathematician (1908–1942)

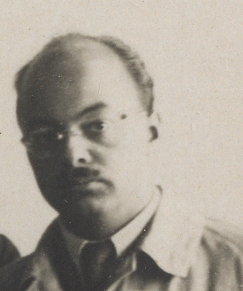
- Van Kampen in 1935
- Born: Egbert Rudolf van Kampen; 28 May 1908; Berchem, Belgium
- Died: 11 February 1942 (aged 33); Baltimore, Maryland, United States
- Education: Leiden University
- Known for: Seifert–Van Kampen theorem Van Kampen diagram
- Scientific career
- Fields: Topology
- Thesis: Die kombinatorische Topologie und die Dualitätssätze (1929)
- Doctoral advisor: Willem van der Woude

Egbert Rudolf van Kampen (28 May 1908 – 11 February 1942) was a Dutch mathematician. He made important contributions to topology, especially to the study of fundamental groups.

== Life ==
Van Kampen was born to Dutch parents in Belgium, where his father had recently taken a job as an accountant in Antwerp. At the outbreak of World War I the family moved back to the Netherlands, first to Amsterdam and in 1918 to The Hague. At the age of 16 he graduated from high school and entered Leiden University to study mathematics. After his undergraduate studies he continued with a doctorate study at the same university under the guidance of Willem van der Woude. In 1927, Van Kampen traveled to the University of Göttingen to meet with Bartel van der Waerden and Pavel Aleksandrov. In the summer of 1928 he worked with Emil Artin at the University of Hamburg. Around that time, while still only 20 years old, he was offered a position by Johns Hopkins University in the United States. He received his Ph.D. degree with Van der Woude in Leiden in 1929, writing a dissertation entitled Die kombinatorische Topologie und die Dualitaetssaetze.

In 1931, Van Kampen took up the position which he had been offered at Johns Hopkins University in Baltimore, Maryland, and travelled to the United States. There he met Oscar Zariski who had taught at Johns Hopkins as a Johnston Scholar from 1927 until 1929, when he had joined the Faculty. Zariski had been working on the fundamental group of the complement of an algebraic curve, and he had found generators and relations for the fundamental group but was unable to show that he had found sufficient relations to give a presentation for the group. Van Kampen solved the problem, showing that Zariski's relations were sufficient, and the result is now known as the Zariski–Van Kampen theorem. This led Van Kampen to formulate and prove what is nowadays known as the Seifert–Van Kampen theorem.

By the late 1930s, Van Kampen started to suffer from headaches which in 1941 were diagnosed to arise from a tumor originating from a birth mark near his ear. After three surgeries in 1941 and 1942, Van Kampen succumbed to cancer and died on 11 February 1942.

== Publications ==
- van Kampen, E. R. (1933). "Komplexe in euklidischen Räumen". Abhandlungen aus dem Mathematischen Seminar der Universität Hamburg (in German). 9: 72–78. doi:10.1007/BF02940628. JFM 58.0615.02. S2CID 121909529.
- van Kampen, Egbert R. (1933). "On the fundamental group of an algebraic curve". American Journal of Mathematics. 55 (1): 255–260. doi:10.2307/2371128. JSTOR 2371128. MR 1506962.
- van Kampen, Egbert R. (1933). "On the connection between the fundamental groups of some related spaces". American Journal of Mathematics. 55 (1): 261–267. doi:10.2307/2371128. JSTOR 2371128. Zbl 0006.41503.
- van Kampen, Egbert R. (1933). "On some lemmas in the theory of groups". American Journal of Mathematics. 55 (1): 268–273. doi:10.2307/2371129. JSTOR 2371129. Zbl 0006.39204.
- van Kampen, E. R. (1935). "Locally bicompact Abelian groups and their character groups". Annals of Mathematics. 36 (2): 448–463. doi:10.2307/1968582. JSTOR 1968582. MR 1503234.
