= Random group =

Mathematical concept

In mathematics, random groups are certain groups obtained by a probabilistic construction. They were introduced by Misha Gromov to answer questions such as "What does a typical group look like?"

It so happens that, once a precise definition is given, random groups satisfy some properties with very high probability, whereas other properties fail with very high probability. For instance, very probably random groups are hyperbolic groups. In this sense, one can say that "most groups are hyperbolic".

== Definition ==
The definition of random groups depends on a probabilistic model on the set of possible groups. Various such probabilistic models yield different (but related) notions of random groups.

Any group can be defined by a group presentation involving generators and relations. For instance, the Abelian group $\mathbb{Z}\times\mathbb{Z}$ has a presentation with two generators $a$ and $b$, and the relation $ab=ba$, or equivalently $aba^{-1}b^{-1}=1$. The main idea of random groups is to start with a fixed number of group generators $a_1,\,a_2,\,\ldots,\,a_m$, and imposing relations of the form $r_1=1,\,r_2=1,\,\ldots,\,r_k=1$ where each $r_j$ is a random word involving the letters $a_i$ and their formal inverses $a_i^{-1}$. To specify a model of random groups is to specify a precise way in which $m$, $k$ and the random relations $r_j$ are chosen.

Once the random relations $r_k$ have been chosen, the resulting random group $G$ is defined in the standard way for group presentations, namely: $G$ is the quotient of the free group $F_m$ with generators $a_1,\,a_2,\,\ldots,\,a_m$, by the normal subgroup $R\subset F_m$ generated by the relations $r_1\,r_2,\,\ldots,\,r_k$ seen as elements of $F_m$:

$$G=F_m/\langle r_1,\,r_2,\,\ldots,\,r_k \rangle.$$

== The few-relator model of random groups ==
The simplest model of random groups is the few-relator model. In this model, a number of generators $m\geq 2$ and a number of relations $k\geq 1$ are fixed. Fix an additional parameter $\ell$ (the length of the relations), which is typically taken very large.

Then, the model consists in choosing the relations $r_1\,r_2,\,\ldots,\,r_k$ at random, uniformly and independently among all possible reduced words of length at most $\ell$ involving the letters $a_i$ and their formal inverses $a_i^{-1}$.

This model is especially interesting when the relation length $\ell$ tends to infinity: with probability tending to $1$ as $\ell\to\infty$ a random group in this model is hyperbolic and satisfies other nice properties.

== Further remarks ==
More refined models of random groups have been defined.

For instance, in the density model, the number of relations is allowed to grow with the length of the relations. Then there is a sharp "phase transition" phenomenon: if the number of relations is larger than some threshold, the random group "collapses" (because the relations allow to show that any word is equal to any other), whereas below the threshold the resulting random group is infinite and hyperbolic.

Constructions of random groups can also be twisted in specific ways to build groups with particular properties. For instance, Gromov used this technique to build new groups that are counter-examples to an extension of the Baum–Connes conjecture.
