= Word metric =

Measuring distances in a discrete group

In group theory, a word metric on a discrete group $G$ is a way to measure distance between any two elements of $G$. As the name suggests, the word metric is a metric on $G$, assigning to any two elements $g$, $h$ of $G$ a distance $d(g,h)$ that measures how efficiently their difference $g^{-1} h$ can be expressed as a word whose letters come from a generating set for the group. The word metric on G is very closely related to the Cayley graph of G: the word metric measures the length of the shortest path in the Cayley graph between two elements of G.

A generating set for $G$ must first be chosen before a word metric on $G$ is specified. Different choices of a generating set will typically yield different word metrics. While this seems at first to be a weakness in the concept of the word metric, it can be exploited to prove theorems about geometric properties of groups, as is done in geometric group theory.

== Examples ==
=== The group of integers ===
The group of integers $\mathbb{Z}$ is generated by the set {−1, +1}. The integer −3 can be expressed as −1 − 1 − 1 + 1 − 1, a word of length 5 in these generators. But the word that expresses −3 most efficiently is −1 − 1 − 1, a word of length 3. The distance between 0 and −3 in the word metric is therefore equal to 3. More generally, the distance between two integers m and n in the word metric is equal to |m − n|, because the shortest word representing the difference m-n has length equal to |m − n|.

=== The group of integer vectors ===
For a more illustrative example, the elements of the group $\mathbb{Z}\oplus\mathbb{Z}$ can be thought of as vectors in the Cartesian plane with integer coefficients. The group $\mathbb{Z}\oplus\mathbb{Z}$ is generated by the standard unit vectors $e_1 = \langle1,0\rangle$, $e_2 = \langle0,1\rangle$ and their inverses $-e_1=\langle-1,0\rangle$, $-e_2=\langle0,-1\rangle$. The Cayley graph of $\mathbb{Z}\oplus\mathbb{Z}$ is the so-called taxicab geometry. It can be pictured in the plane as an infinite square grid of city streets, where each horizontal and vertical line with integer coordinates is a street, and each point of $\mathbb{Z}\oplus\mathbb{Z}$ lies at the intersection of a horizontal and a vertical street. Each horizontal segment between two vertices represents the generating vector $e_1$ or $-e_1$, depending on whether the segment is travelled in the forward or backward direction, and each vertical segment represents $e_2$ or $-e_2$. A car starting from $\langle1,2\rangle$ and travelling along the streets to $\langle-2,4\rangle$ can make the trip by many different routes. But no matter what route is taken, the car must travel at least |1 − (−2)| = 3 horizontal blocks and at least |2 − 4| = 2 vertical blocks, for a total trip distance of at least 3 + 2 = 5. If the car goes out of its way the trip may be longer, but the minimal distance travelled by the car, equal in value to the word metric between $\langle1,2\rangle$ and $\langle-2,4\rangle$ is therefore equal to 5.

In general, given two elements $v = \langle i,j\rangle$ and $w = \langle k,l\rangle$ of $\mathbb{Z}\oplus\mathbb{Z}$, the distance between $v$ and $w$ in the word metric is equal to $|i-k| + |j-l|$.

== Definition ==
Let G be a group, let S be a generating set for G, and suppose that S is closed under the inverse operation on G. A word over the set S is just a finite sequence $w = s_1 \ldots s_L$ whose entries $s_1, \ldots, s_L$ are elements of S. The integer L is called the length of the word $w$. Using the group operation in G, the entries of a word $w = s_1 \ldots s_L$ can be multiplied in order, remembering that the entries are elements of G. The result of this multiplication is an element $\bar w$ in the group G, which is called the evaluation of the word w. As a special case, the empty word $w = \emptyset$ has length zero, and its evaluation is the identity element of G.

Given an element g of G, its word norm |g| with respect to the generating set S is defined to be the shortest length of a word $w$ over S whose evaluation $\bar w$ is equal to g. Given two elements g,h in G, the distance d(g,h) in the word metric with respect to S is defined to be $|g^{-1} h|$. Equivalently, d(g,h) is the shortest length of a word w over S such that $g \bar w = h$.

The word metric on G satisfies the axioms for a metric, and it is not hard to prove this. The proof of the symmetry axiom d(g,h) = d(h,g) for a metric uses the assumption that the generating set S is closed under inverse.

=== Variations ===
The word metric has an equivalent definition formulated in more geometric terms using the Cayley graph of G with respect to the generating set S. When each edge of the Cayley graph is assigned a metric of length 1, the distance between two group elements g,h in G is equal to the shortest length of a path in the Cayley graph from the vertex g to the vertex h.

The word metric on G can also be defined without assuming that the generating set S is closed under inverse. To do this, first symmetrize S, replacing it by a larger generating set consisting of each $s$ in S as well as its inverse $s^{-1}$. Then define the word metric with respect to S to be the word metric with respect to the symmetrization of S.

== Example in a free group ==
In the free group on the two element set {a, b}, the distance between a and b in the word metric equals 2

Suppose that F is the free group on the two element set $\{a,b\}$. A word w in the symmetric generating set $\{a,b,a^{-1},b^{-1}\}$ is said to be reduced if the letters $a,a^{-1}$ do not occur next to each other in w, nor do the letters $b,b^{-1}$. Every element $g \in F$ is represented by a unique reduced word, and this reduced word is the shortest word representing g. For example, since the word $w = b^{-1} a$ is reduced and has length 2, the word norm of $w$ equals 2, so the distance in the word norm between $b$ and $a$ equals 2. This can be visualized in terms of the Cayley graph, where the shortest path between b and a has length 2.

== Theorems ==
=== Isometry of the left action ===
The group G acts on itself by left multiplication: the action of each $k \in G$ takes each $g \in G$ to $kg$. This action is an isometry of the word metric. The proof is simple: the distance between $kg$ and $kh$ equals $|(kg)^{-1} (kh)| = |g^{-1} h|$, which equals the distance between $g$ and $h$.

=== Bilipschitz invariants of a group ===
In general, the word metric on a group G is not unique, because different symmetric generating sets give different word metrics. However, finitely generated word metrics are unique up to bilipschitz equivalence: if $S$, $T$ are two symmetric, finite generating sets for G with corresponding word metrics $d_S$, $d_T$, then there is a constant $K \ge 1$ such that for any $g,h \in G$,

$$\frac{1}{K} \, d_T(g,h) \le d_S(g,h) \le K \, d_T(g,h)$$.

This constant K is just the maximum of the $d_S$ word norms of elements of $T$ and the $d_T$ word norms of elements of $S$. This proof is also easy: any word over S can be converted by substitution into a word over T, expanding the length of the word by a factor of at most K, and similarly for converting words over T into words over S.

The bilipschitz equivalence of word metrics implies in turn that the growth rate of a finitely generated group is a well-defined isomorphism invariant of the group, independent of the choice of a finite generating set. This implies in turn that various properties of growth, such as polynomial growth, the degree of polynomial growth, and exponential growth, are isomorphism invariants of groups. This topic is discussed further in the article on the growth rate of a group.

=== Quasi-isometry invariants of a group ===
In geometric group theory, groups are studied by their actions on metric spaces. A principle that generalizes the bilipschitz invariance of word metrics says that any finitely generated word metric on G is quasi-isometric to any proper, geodesic metric space on which G acts, properly discontinuously and cocompactly. Metric spaces on which G acts in this manner are called model spaces for G.

It follows in turn that any quasi-isometrically invariant property satisfied by the word metric of G or by any model space of G is an isomorphism invariant of G. Modern geometric group theory is in large part the study of quasi-isometry invariants.

== See also ==
- Length function
- Longest element of a Coxeter group
