= Švarc–Milnor lemma =

Mathematicl group theory

In the mathematical subject of geometric group theory, the Švarc–Milnor lemma (sometimes also called Milnor–Švarc lemma, with both variants also sometimes spelling Švarc as Schwarz) is a statement which says that a group $G$, equipped with a "nice" discrete isometric action on a metric space $X$, is quasi-isometric to $X$.

This result goes back, in different form, before the notion of quasi-isometry was formally introduced, to the work of Albert S. Schwarz (1955) and John Milnor (1968). Pierre de la Harpe called the Švarc–Milnor lemma "the fundamental observation in geometric group theory" because of its importance for the subject. Occasionally the name "fundamental observation in geometric group theory" is now used for this statement, instead of calling it the Švarc–Milnor lemma; see, for example, Theorem 8.2 in the book of Farb and Margalit.

== Precise statement ==
Several minor variations of the statement of the lemma exist in the literature. Here we follow the version given in the book of Bridson and Haefliger (see Proposition 8.19 on p. 140 there).

Let $G$ be a group acting by isometries on a proper length space $X$ such that the action is properly discontinuous and cocompact.

Then the group $G$ is finitely generated and for every finite generating set $S$ of $G$ and every point $p\in X$ the orbit map

$$f_p:(G,d_S)\to X, \quad g\mapsto gp$$

is a quasi-isometry.

Here $d_S$ is the word metric on $G$ corresponding to $S$.

Sometimes a properly discontinuous cocompact isometric action of a group $G$ on a proper geodesic metric space $X$ is called a geometric action.

== Explanation of the terms ==
Recall that a metric space $X$ is proper if every closed ball in $X$ is compact.

An action of $G$ on $X$ is properly discontinuous if for every compact $K\subseteq X$ the set

$$\{g\in G \mid gK\cap K\ne \varnothing\}$$

is finite.

The action of $G$ on $X$ is cocompact if the quotient space $X/G$, equipped with the quotient topology, is compact. Under the other assumptions of the Švarc–Milnor lemma, the cocompactness condition is equivalent to the existence of a closed ball $B$ in $X$ such that

$$\bigcup_{g\in G} gB=X.$$

== Examples of applications of the Švarc–Milnor lemma ==
For Examples 1 through 5 below see pp. 89–90 in the book of de la Harpe. Example 6 is the starting point of the part of the paper of Richard Schwartz.

1. For every $n\ge 1$ the group $\mathbb Z^n$ is quasi-isometric to the Euclidean space $\mathbb R^n$.
2. If $\Sigma$ is a closed connected oriented surface of negative Euler characteristic then the fundamental group $\pi_1(\Sigma)$ is quasi-isometric to the hyperbolic plane $\mathbb H^2$.
3. If $(M,g)$ is a closed connected smooth manifold with a smooth Riemannian metric $g$ then $\pi_1(M)$ is quasi-isometric to $(\tilde M, d_{\tilde g})$, where $\tilde M$ is the universal cover of $M$, where $\tilde g$ is the pull-back of $g$ to $\tilde M$, and where $d_{\tilde g}$ is the path metric on $\tilde M$ defined by the Riemannian metric $\tilde g$.
4. If $G$ is a connected finite-dimensional Lie group equipped with a left-invariant Riemannian metric and the corresponding path metric, and if $\Gamma\le G$ is a uniform lattice then $\Gamma$ is quasi-isometric to $G$.
5. If $M$ is a closed hyperbolic 3-manifold, then $\pi_1(M)$ is quasi-isometric to $\mathbb H^3$.
6. If $M$ is a complete finite volume hyperbolic 3-manifold with cusps, then $\Gamma=\pi_1(M)$ is quasi-isometric to $\Omega= \mathbb H^3-\mathcal B$, where $\mathcal B$ is a certain $\Gamma$-invariant collection of horoballs, and where $\Omega$ is equipped with the induced path metric.

== Proof ==
For the sake of simplicity, we assume that $X$ is a geodesic metric space. This proof readily carries over to the more general setting.

=== Sketch of the proof ===
Fix any $x_0\in X$. Since the action is cocompact and $X$ is proper, we may find $R>0$ such that the $G$-translates of $B(x_0, R)$ cover the whole space $X$. That is,

| $X=\bigcup_{g\in G}{B(gx_0, R)}$. | 1 |

Consider the subset $S=\{g\mid gx_0\in B(x_0, 2R+1)\}$ which is finite, because the action is proper. Note that it suffices to show that such $S$ generates $G$ and that its Cayley graph, denoted $Cay(G, S)$, is quasi-isometric to $X$. Indeed, because $G$ acts properly and cocompactly and by isometries on its own Cayley graph, applying this theorem with $X= Cay(G, S^\prime)$ shows that the theorem holds for every $S^\prime$, by transitivity.

Divide the geodesic between $x_0$ and $gx_0$ into $n$ pieces, where each piece is of length $1$, except possibly the last piece, which may be less than $1$. Denote the endpoints of these pieces by

$$p_0(=x_0), p_1, \dots, p_n(=gx_0)$$.

For each $p_i$, we may take $g_i\in G$ such that $p_i\in B(g_ix_0, R)$. Setting $g_0=e$ and $g_n=g$. By a triangle inequality, and since the action is by isometries, we have

| $d(x_0, g_{i-1}^{-1}g_ix_0)=d(g_{i-1}x_0, g_ix_0)\le 2R+1$. | 2 |

Thus, by definition of $S$, $g_{i-1}^{-1}g_i=:s_i\in S$. Therefore, $g=s_1s_2\cdots s_n$ and hence $\|g\|_S\le n$. Also, $g$ is arbitrary, so $S$ generates $G$.

Additionally, because each $p_i$ lies along a geodesic from $x_0$ to $gx_0$ with segment lengths of at most $1$, the following inequality holds

| $d(x_0, gx_0)\ge n-1\ge \|g\|_S-1$. | 3 |

By repeatedly applying (2) between each $g_{i-1}x_0$ and $g_ix_0$, and by the triangle inequality, it's easy to see that

| $d(x_0, gx_0)\le (2R+1)\cdot \|g\|_S$. | 4 |

Now, (3) and (4) imply that for any $u, v\in G$,

| $d_S(u, v)-1\le d(ux_0, vx_0)\le (2R+1)\cdot d_S(u, v)$, | 5 |

where we take $u^{-1}v$ as the above $g$.

From (1), the [coarse surjectivity] clearly holds.

=== How to extend the map ===
Finally, by identifying each edge of $Cay(G, S)$ as the geodesic between two vertices of length $1$, we may extend the domain from $G$ to $Cay(G, S)$. More precisely, we can map the geodesic between $u$ and $v$ to the geodesic between $ux_0$ and $vx_0$ in $X$.

Note that the value of $d_S(g, h)$ varies at most $1$ from $d_S(u, v)$, and $d(gx_0, hx_0)$ varies at most $M$ from $d(ux_0, vx_0)$. If we denote

$$M:=\max_{u^{-1}v\in S}{d(ux_0, vx_0)}=\max_{s\in S}{d(x_0, sx_0)}$$,

this makes sense because $S$ is finite.

Incorporating the adjustment $(2R+1)\cdot 1+M$ into (5), we have demonstrated that this map is a quasi-isometry.
