= Product metric =

Metric on the Cartesian product of finitely many metric spaces

In mathematics, a product metric is a metric on the Cartesian product of finitely many metric spaces $(X_1,d_{X_1}),\ldots,(X_n,d_{X_n})$ which metrizes the product topology. The most prominent product metrics are the p product metrics for a fixed $p\in[1,\infty)$ : It is defined as the p norm of the n-vector of the distances measured in n subspaces:

$$d_p((x_1,\ldots,x_n),(y_1,\ldots,y_n)) = \|\left(d_{X_1}(x_1,y_1), \ldots, d_{X_n}(x_n,y_n)\right)\|_p$$

For $p=\infty$ this metric is also called the sup metric:

$$d_{\infty} ((x_1,\ldots,x_n),(y_1,\ldots,y_n)) := \max \left\{ d_{X_1}(x_1,y_1), \ldots, d_{X_n}(x_n,y_n) \right\}.$$

== Choice of norm ==
For Euclidean spaces, using the L_{2} norm gives rise to the Euclidean metric in the product space; however, any other choice of p will lead to a topologically equivalent metric space. In the category of metric spaces (with Lipschitz maps having Lipschitz constant 1), the product (in the category theory sense) uses the sup metric.

== The case of Riemannian manifolds ==
For Riemannian manifolds $(M_1,g_1)$ and $(M_2,g_2)$, the product metric $g=g_1\oplus g_2$ on $M_1\times M_2$ is defined by

$$g(X_1+X_2,Y_1+Y_2)=g_1(X_1,Y_1)+g_2(X_2,Y_2)$$

for $X_i,Y_i\in T_{p_i}M_i$ under the natural identification $T_{(p_1,p_2)}(M_1\times M_2)=T_{p_1}M_1\oplus T_{p_2}M_2$.
