= Presentation complex =

In geometric group theory, a presentation complex is a 2-dimensional cell complex associated to any presentation of a group G. The complex has a single vertex, and one loop at the vertex for each generator of G. There is one 2-cell for each relation in the presentation, with the boundary of the 2-cell attached along the appropriate word.

== Properties ==
- The fundamental group of the presentation complex is the group G itself.
- The universal cover of the presentation complex is a Cayley complex for G, whose 1-skeleton is the Cayley graph of G.
- Any presentation complex for G is the 2-skeleton of an Eilenberg–MacLane space $K(G,1)$.

== Examples ==
Let $G= \Z^2$ be the two-dimensional integer lattice, with presentation

$$G=\langle x,y|xyx^{-1}y^{-1}\rangle.$$

Then the presentation complex for G is a torus, obtained by gluing the opposite sides of a square, the 2-cell, which are labelled x and y. All four corners of the square are glued into a single vertex, the 0-cell of the presentation complex, while a pair consisting of a longtitudal and meridian circles on the torus, intersecting at the vertex, constitutes its 1-skeleton.

The associated Cayley complex is a regular tiling of the plane by unit squares. The 1-skeleton of this complex is a Cayley graph for $\Z^2$.

Let $G = \Z_2 *\Z_2$ be the Infinite dihedral group, with presentation $\langle a,b \mid a^2,b^2 \rangle$. The presentation complex for $G$ is $\mathbb{RP}^2 \vee \mathbb{RP}^2$, the wedge sum of projective planes. For each path, there is one 2-cell glued to each loop, which provides the standard cell structure for each projective plane. The Cayley complex is an infinite string of spheres.
