= Quasi-isometry =

Function between two metric spaces that only respects their large-scale geometry

In mathematics, a quasi-isometry is a function between two metric spaces that respects large-scale geometry of these spaces and ignores their small-scale details. Two metric spaces are quasi-isometric if there exists a quasi-isometry between them. The property of being quasi-isometric behaves like an equivalence relation on the class of metric spaces.

The concept of quasi-isometry is especially important in geometric group theory, following the work of Gromov.

This lattice is quasi-isometric to the plane.

== Definition ==
Suppose that $f$ is a (not necessarily continuous) function from one metric space $(M_1,d_1)$ to a second metric space $(M_2,d_2)$. Then $f$ is called a quasi-isometry from $(M_1,d_1)$ to $(M_2,d_2)$ if there exist constants $A\ge 1$, $B\ge 0$, and $C\ge 0$ such that the following two properties both hold:

1. For every two points $x$ and $y$ in $M_1$, the distance between their images is up to the additive constant $B$ within a factor of $A$ of their original distance. More formally:
  $$\forall x,y\in M_1: \frac{1}{A}\; d_1(x,y)-B\leq d_2(f(x),f(y))\leq A\; d_1(x,y)+B.$$
2. Every point of $M_2$ is within the constant distance $C$ of an image point. More formally:
  $$\forall z\in M_2:\exists x\in M_1: d_2(z,f(x))\le C.$$

The two metric spaces $(M_1,d_1)$ and $(M_2,d_2)$ are called quasi-isometric if there exists a quasi-isometry $f$ from $(M_1,d_1)$ to $(M_2,d_2)$.

A map is called a quasi-isometric embedding if it satisfies the first condition but not necessarily the second (i.e. it is coarsely Lipschitz but may fail to be coarsely surjective). In other words, if through the map, $(M_1,d_1)$ is quasi-isometric to a subspace of $(M_2,d_2)$.

Two metric spaces M_{1} and M_{2} are said to be quasi-isometric, denoted $M_1\underset{q.i.}{\sim} M_2$, if there exists a quasi-isometry $f:M_1\to M_2$.

== Examples ==
The map between the Euclidean plane and the plane with the Manhattan distance that sends every point to itself is a quasi-isometry: in it, distances are multiplied by a factor of at most $\sqrt 2$. Note that there can be no isometry, since, for example, the points $(1, 0), (-1, 0), (0, 1), (0, -1)$ are of equal distance to each other in Manhattan distance, but in the Euclidean plane, there are no 4 points that are of equal distance to each other.

The map $f:\mathbb{Z}^n\to\mathbb{R}^n$ (both with the Euclidean metric) that sends every $n$-tuple of integers to itself is a quasi-isometry: distances are preserved exactly, and every real tuple is within distance $\sqrt{n/4}$ of an integer tuple. In the other direction, the discontinuous function that rounds every tuple of real numbers to the nearest integer tuple is also a quasi-isometry: each point is taken by this map to a point within distance $\sqrt{n/4}$ of it, so rounding changes the distance between pairs of points by adding or subtracting at most $2\sqrt{n/4}$.

Every pair of finite or bounded metric spaces is quasi-isometric. In this case, every function from one space to the other is a quasi-isometry.

== Equivalence relation ==
If $f:M_1\mapsto M_2$ is a quasi-isometry, then there exists a quasi-isometry $g:M_2\mapsto M_1$. Indeed, $g(x)$ may be defined by letting $y$ be any point in the image of $f$ that is within distance $C$ of $x$, and letting $g(x)$ be any point in $f^{-1}(y)$.

Since the identity map is a quasi-isometry, and the composition of two quasi-isometries is a quasi-isometry, it follows that the property of being quasi-isometric behaves like an equivalence relation on the class of metric spaces.

== Use in geometric group theory ==
Given a finite generating set S of a finitely generated group G, we can form the corresponding Cayley graph of S and G. This graph becomes a metric space if we declare the length of each edge to be 1. Taking a different finite generating set T results in a different graph and a different metric space, however the two spaces are quasi-isometric. This quasi-isometry class is thus an invariant of the group G. Any property of metric spaces that only depends on a space's quasi-isometry class immediately yields another invariant of groups, opening the field of group theory to geometric methods.

More generally, the Švarc–Milnor lemma states that if a group G acts properly discontinuously with compact quotient on a proper geodesic space X then G is quasi-isometric to X (meaning that any Cayley graph for G is). This gives new examples of groups quasi-isometric to each other:

- If G' is a subgroup of finite index in G then G' is quasi-isometric to G;
- If G and H are the fundamental groups of two compact hyperbolic manifolds of the same dimension d then they are both quasi-isometric to the hyperbolic space H^{d} and hence to each other; on the other hand there are infinitely many quasi-isometry classes of fundamental groups of finite-volume.

== Quasigeodesics and the Morse lemma ==
A quasi-geodesic in a metric space $(X, d)$ is a quasi-isometric embedding of $\mathbb R$ into $X$. More precisely a map $\phi: \mathbb R \to X$ such that there exists $C,K > 0$ so that

$$\forall s, t \in \mathbb R : C^{-1} |s - t| - K \le d(\phi(t), \phi(s)) \le C|s - t| + K$$

is called a $(C,K)$-quasi-geodesic. Obviously geodesics (parametrised by arclength) are quasi-geodesics. The fact that in some spaces the converse is coarsely true, i.e. that every quasi-geodesic stays within bounded distance of a true geodesic, is called the Morse Lemma (not to be confused with the Morse lemma in differential topology). Formally the statement is:

Let $\delta, C, K > 0$ and $X$ a proper δ-hyperbolic space. There exists $M$ such that for any $(C, K)$-quasi-geodesic $\phi$ there exists a geodesic $L$ in $X$ such that $d(\phi(t), L) \le M$ for all $t \in \mathbb R$.

It is an important tool in geometric group theory. An immediate application is that any quasi-isometry between proper hyperbolic spaces induces a homeomorphism between their boundaries. This result is the first step in the proof of the Mostow rigidity theorem.

Furthermore, this result has found utility in analyzing user interaction design in applications similar to Google Maps.

== Examples of quasi-isometry invariants of groups ==
The following are some examples of properties of group Cayley graphs that are invariant under quasi-isometry:

=== Hyperbolicity ===
A group is called hyperbolic if one of its Cayley graphs is a δ-hyperbolic space for some δ. When translating between different definitions of hyperbolicity, the particular value of δ may change, but the resulting notions of a hyperbolic group turn out to be equivalent.

Hyperbolic groups have a solvable word problem. They are biautomatic and automatic.: indeed, they are strongly geodesically automatic, that is, there is an automatic structure on the group, where the language accepted by the word acceptor is the set of all geodesic words.

=== Growth ===
The growth rate of a group with respect to a symmetric generating set describes the size of balls in the group. Every element in the group can be written as a product of generators, and the growth rate counts the number of elements that can be written as a product of length n.

According to Gromov's theorem, a group of polynomial growth is virtually nilpotent, i.e. it has a nilpotent subgroup of finite index. In particular, the order of polynomial growth $k_0$ has to be a natural number and in fact $\#(n)\sim n^{k_0}$.

If $\#(n)$ grows more slowly than any exponential function, G has a subexponential growth rate. Any such group is amenable.

=== Ends ===
The ends of a topological space are, roughly speaking, the connected components of the “ideal boundary” of the space. That is, each end represents a topologically distinct way to move to infinity within the space. Adding a point at each end yields a compactification of the original space, known as the end compactification.

The ends of a finitely generated group are defined to be the ends of the corresponding Cayley graph; this definition is independent of the choice of a finite generating set. Every finitely-generated infinite group has either 1, 2, or infinitely many ends, and Stallings theorem about ends of groups provides a decomposition for groups with more than one end.

If two connected locally finite graphs are quasi-isometric then they have the same number of ends. In particular, two quasi-isometric finitely generated groups have the same number of ends.

=== Amenability ===
An amenable group is a locally compact topological group G carrying a kind of averaging operation on bounded functions that is invariant under translation by group elements. The original definition, in terms of a finitely additive invariant measure (or mean) on subsets of G, was introduced by John von Neumann in 1929 under the German name "messbar" ("measurable" in English) in response to the Banach–Tarski paradox. In 1949 Mahlon M. Day introduced the English translation "amenable", apparently as a pun.

In discrete group theory, where G has the discrete topology, a simpler definition is used. In this setting, a group is amenable if one can say what proportion of G any given subset takes up.

If a group has a Følner sequence then it is automatically amenable.

=== Asymptotic cone ===
An ultralimit is a geometric construction that assigns to a sequence of metric spaces X_{n} a limiting metric space. An important class of ultralimits are the so-called asymptotic cones of metric spaces. Let (X,d) be a metric space, let ω be a non-principal ultrafilter on $\mathbb N$ and let p_{n} ∈ X be a sequence of base-points. Then the ω–ultralimit of the sequence $(X, \frac{d}{n}, p_n)$ is called the asymptotic cone of X with respect to ω and $(p_n)_n\,$ and is denoted $Cone_\omega(X,d, (p_n)_n)\,$. One often takes the base-point sequence to be constant, p_{n} = p for some p ∈ X; in this case the asymptotic cone does not depend on the choice of p ∈ X and is denoted by $Cone_\omega(X,d)\,$ or just $Cone_\omega(X)\,$.

The notion of an asymptotic cone plays an important role in geometric group theory since asymptotic cones (or, more precisely, their topological types and bi-Lipschitz types) provide quasi-isometry invariants of metric spaces in general and of finitely generated groups in particular. Asymptotic cones also turn out to be a useful tool in the study of relatively hyperbolic groups and their generalizations.

== See also ==
- Isometry
- Coarse structure
