= Dave Thomas (skeptic) =

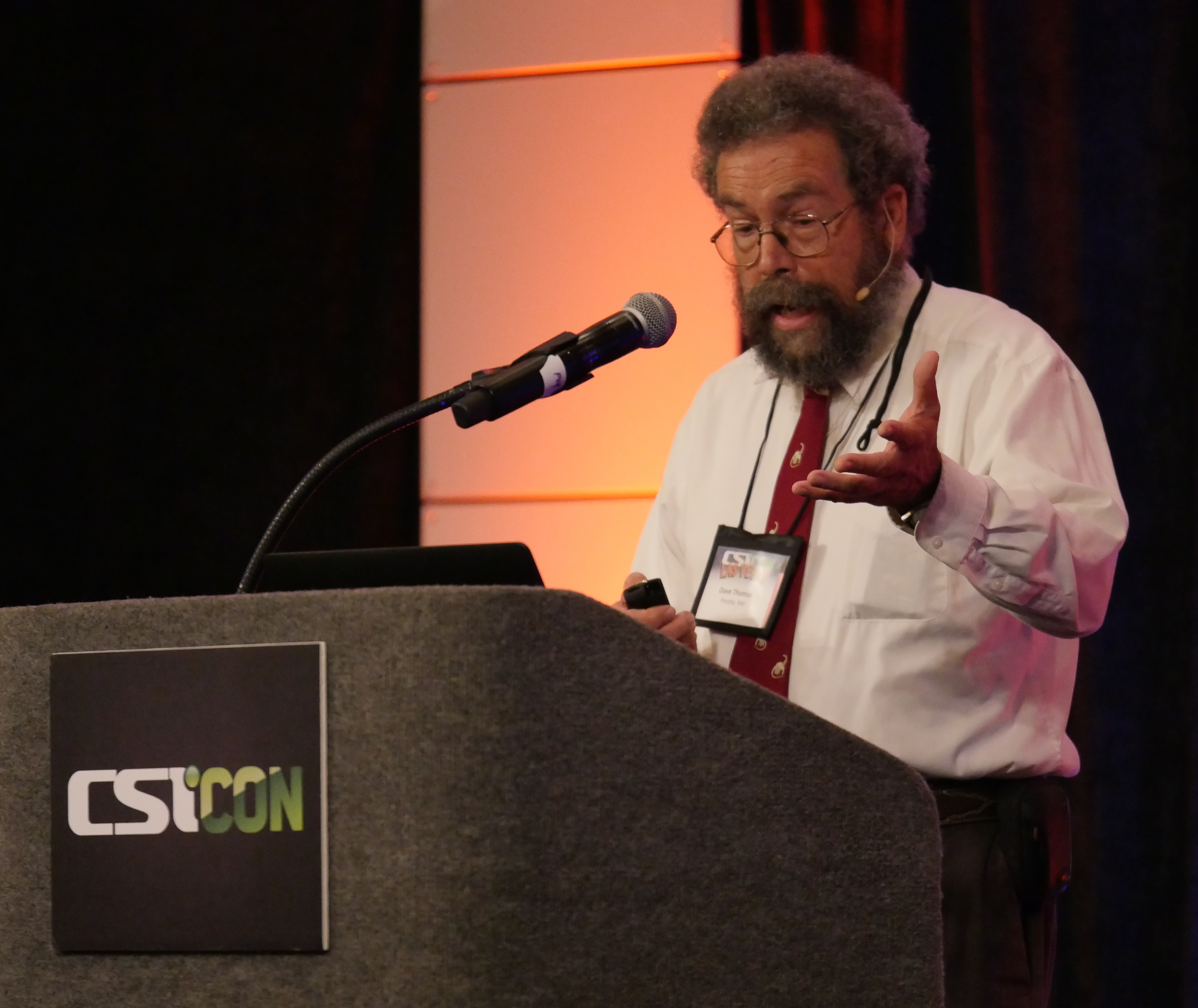
- Thomas speaking at CSICon in 2016
- Born: 1953 (age 72–73)
- Citizenship: USA
- Education: New Mexico Institute of Mining and Technology
- Known for: Writings and research on scientific skepticism
- Awards: 1979 Brown Medal; 1981 Langmuir Award; 2000 Friend of Darwin Award
- Scientific career
- Fields: Mathematics, physics, computer programming, expert systems
- Workplaces: BDM International, Inc.; ITW Magnaflux/Quasar; IRIS PASSCAL Instrument Center, New Mexico Tech.
- Dave Thomas's voice recorded October 2016 at CSICon

David E. Thomas (born 1953) is a scientist and software engineer best known for his scientific skepticism research and writings. He is a graduate of the New Mexico Institute of Mining and Technology, and his skeptic work covers the Roswell and Aztec UFO sightings, the Bible code, global warming, the 9/11 Truth movement and chemtrails. Thomas is frequently published in Skeptical Inquirer magazine.

Thomas currently works at the Program for Array Seismic Studies of the Continental Lithosphere (PASSCAL) at New Mexico Tech and is an adjunct instructor of psychology and education there.

== Education and awards ==
Thomas is a graduate of the New Mexico Institute of Mining and Technology and holds a bachelor's degree in mathematics and physics and a master's degree in mathematics. He received the Brown Award, New Mexico Tech's highest undergraduate award, in 1979, the Langmuir publication award as a graduate student, and the National Center for Science Education's Friend of Darwin Award.

Thomas has served as president of the New Mexico Academy of Science and is a fellow of the Committee for Skeptical Inquiry. He has been both a board member of the Coalition for Excellence on Science and Math Education (CESE) and the president of New Mexicans for Science and Reason since 1998.

== Career ==
Thomas worked at BDM International, Inc. in Albuquerque from 1981 to 1994 and for ITW Magnaflux/Quasar from 1994 to 2007.

Thomas and scientist Kim Johnson co-hosted Science Watch, a weekly podcast on AM 1350, from 2005 to 2010 and has been published in Skeptical Inquirer since 1995.

== Skepticism ==
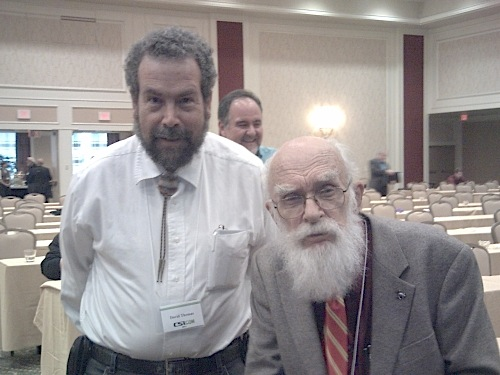
David E. Thomas and James Randi

=== UFOs ===
Regarding the Roswell UFO incident, Thomas has joked that "My theory...is that the Roswell ship did not actually crash, that it only landed and took off again and continued to land at all these other sites." He maintains that the incident involved a crashed Project Mogul balloon and was not in any way related to extraterrestrial activity. Thomas also frequently discusses the Aztec, New Mexico, UFO incident hoax, and his explanation of the scam at the Aztec UFO Symposium ended his regular speaking appearance there. The Symposium's last meeting was in 2011. In 2009, Thomas presented at UFOcon in Tucson, Arizona, where he covered both incidents.

=== Bible code ===
Thomas has applied his knowledge of mathematics and computer engineering to dispute the credibility of the Bible code He offers coincidental examples of secrets "coded" in other texts, such as apparent references to Hitler in War and Peace and the phrase "The code is a silly snake-oil hoax" in Michael Drosnin's The Bible Code. Thomas maintains that "Hidden messages can be found anywhere, provided you're willing to invest time and effort to harvest the vast field of probability." Matt Young's No Sense of Obligation, a skeptical examination of science and religion, references Thomas's work.

=== Climate change ===
In 2014, Thomas joined fellow scientist Kim Johnson on Albuquerque's 94 Rock morning show for a four-part conversation regarding climate change. They discussed the geographic patterns and implications of global warming as well as refuting the idea that human interference has a negligible effect on the crisis.

That same year, Thomas joined more than 60 fellow skeptics clarifying the media's use of "skeptic" and "denier" when discussing those who undermine and reject climate science. The letter explains that "Proper skepticism promotes scientific inquiry, critical investigation, and the use of reason in examining controversial and extraordinary claims. It is foundational to the scientific method. Denial, on the other hand, is the a priori rejection of ideas without objective consideration."

=== The 9/11 Truth movement ===
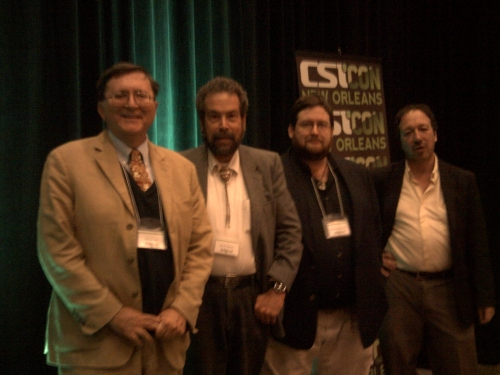
Left to right: Ted Goertzel, Thomas, Bob Blaskiewicz and Scott Lilienfeld at the CSICon 2011 conspiracy theories panel.

Thomas has engaged in several public debates with advocates of the 9/11 Truth movement. After offering a live refutation to architect Richard Gage's 2009 New Mexico Tech alumni weekend presentation on the collapse of the twin towers, Thomas debated Gage and chemist Niels Harrit on the same subject live on Ian Punnett's nationally syndicated radio show Coast to Coast in 2010. In 2014, Thomas and Michael Fullerton took part in a similar debate conducted via YouTube.

Thomas has written scientific refutations of other conspiracy theorists' claims surrounding the September 11 attacks.

=== Creationist legislation and intelligent design ===
In February 2011, the Education Committee of the New Mexico House of Representatives voted 5–4 to table House Bill 302, which sought to prevent public school teachers from being disciplined or removed from their positions for teaching "relevant scientific information regarding either the scientific strengths or scientific weaknesses pertaining to 'controversial' scientific topics". Thomas testified his concern that the bill "is really just a ploy to get creationism in the classroom." In The Panda's Thumb, he wrote "The proposed legislation is not needed by New Mexico's students or teachers. New Mexico's existing standards already protect students from religious indoctrination or harassment by their teachers. Furthermore, the bill is unconstitutional as written, and its passage and enactment will almost certainly result in expensive litigation." He alleged that the bill originated as part of the intelligent design movement and pro-intelligent design think tank groups.

At CSICon 2011, Thomas presented "Something Rotten In Denmark: How Hamlet's 'Weasel' Reveals The Vacuousness Of Intelligent Design" where he discussed genetic algorithms as well as reviewing the status of the New Mexico bill. In 2004, Thomas offered the "opposing view" for the New Mexico division of the Intelligent Design Network's Darwin, Design and Democracy V symposium where he outlined why intelligent design is inappropriate for public school science curriculum.

== Personal life ==
Thomas is married and has two sons. He performs juggling and magic shows and was a member of The Vigilante Band on bass guitar, mandolin and vocals.
