= The Bible Code: Saving the World =

2010 book by Michael Drosnin

- Author: Michael Drosnin
- Series: The Bible Code
- Publication date: 2010
- ISBN: 0-615-39963-0
- Preceded by: The Bible Code II: The Countdown

The Bible Code: Saving the World (2010, ISBN 0-615-39963-0), written by Michael Drosnin, is the third book in The Bible Code series. It expands the theme of The Bible Code II: The Countdown, about the search for an obelisk which could unlock the Bible code completely, suggesting that the code was written by extraterrestrial life (which he claims also brought the DNA of the human genetic code to Earth) and that the alien who brought the code left the key to the code in a steel obelisk.

Drosnin attempted to find this obelisk and explain why the Third World War did not begin in 2006 as Drosnin had suggested in The Bible Code II. These events did not occur, casting serious doubt on the whole paradigm.
