= Tree-graded space =

A geodesic metric space $X$ is called a tree-graded space with respect to a collection of connected proper subsets called pieces, if any two distinct pieces intersect in at most one point, and every non-trivial simple geodesic triangle of $X$ is contained in one of the pieces.

Tree-graded spaces behave like real trees "up to what can happen within the pieces", while allowing non-tree-like behavior within the pieces. For example, any topologically embedded circle is contained in a piece; there is a well-defined projection on every piece, such that every path-connected subset meeting a piece in at most one point projects to a unique point on that piece; the space is naturally fibered into real trees that are transverse to pieces; and pieces can be "merged along embedded paths" in a way that preserves a tree-graded structure.

Tree-graded spaces were introduced by Cornelia Druţu and Mark Sapir (2005) in their study of the asymptotic cones of relatively hyperbolic groups. This point of view allows for a notion of relative hyperbolicity that makes sense for geodesic metric spaces and which is invariant under quasi-isometries.

For instance, a CAT(0) group has isolated flats, if and only if all its asymptotic cones are tree-graded metric spaces all of whose pieces are isometric to euclidean spaces.
