= Limit group =

Limit groups over free groups

In mathematics, specifically in group theory and logics, limit groups are the finitely generated groups that admit a presentation which is a limit of free group presentations in the discrete Chabauty topology. Formerly known as fully residually free groups, they arise naturally in the study of equations in free groups and have gained significance through the work of Sela on Tarski's problem. They now form a well-studied class of examples in geometric group theory and have led to generalizations such as limit groups over hyperbolic and certain relatively hyperbolic groups.

Basic examples include free groups themselves, hyperbolic orientable surface groups, and free products of free abelian groups. A concrete classification is provided by the hierarchy of constructible limit groups.

== Definitions and characterizations ==
=== The space of marked groups and the Chabauty topology ===
For $n\ge 1$, the space of marked groups $\mathcal{G}_n$ is the set of normal subgroups of the free group $F_n$. Because $F_n$ is a discrete group, the Chabauty topology is the topology on $\mathcal{G}_n$ induced by the product topology, or Tychonoff topology, on the power set $\{0, 1\}^{F_n}$ (where $\{0, 1\}$ is discrete). Thus one can say that two elements $N, N'$ of $\mathcal{G}_n$ are "close" if one has $S\cap N = S\cap N'$ for a "big" finite subset $S\subset F_n$. Since a group presentation with $n$ generators can be regarded as an epimorphism from $F_n$, which is the same as a quotient of $F_n$, the set of all group presentations involving a set of $n$ letters is naturally in bijection with $\mathcal{G}_n$ and thus inherits its topology. One may regard elements of $\mathcal{G}_n$ either as subgroups, presentations or epimorphisms.

For $1\le k\le n$, a limit group over $F_k$ is the quotient of $F_n$ by an element of the topological closure of the set of normal subgroups $N\triangleleft F_n$ such that $F_n / N$ is isomorphic to $F_k$. As the space $\mathcal{G}_n$ is compact metrizable, this is the same as a limit of a sequence of epimorphisms $\phi_i: F_n\longrightarrow F_k$. A limit group is a finitely generated group for which a presentation arises in this way for some $1\le k\le n$.

=== Fully residually free groups ===
A finitely generated group $G$ is said to be fully residually free if for all finite subset $B\subset G$, there exists a free group $F$ and a homomorphism $f: G\longrightarrow F$ whose restriction to $B$ is injective.

One can see that finitely generated fully residually free groups are limit groups, as follows. If $G$ is generated by $n$ elements, then there is an epimorphism $g: F_n\longrightarrow G$. Taking an increasing countable exhaustion of $G$ by finite subsets $B_i$, one has homomorphisms $f_i: G\longrightarrow F_{k_i}$ whose restriction to $B_i$ is injective, and since any $n$-generated subgroup of a free group is a free group of rank at most $n$, one can assume that $f_i$s are epimorphisms and $k_i \leq n$. A subsequence of $f_i\circ g$ tends to $g$ and has constant $k_i=k$, hence $G$ is a limit group over $F_k$.

The converse also holds (but is harder to prove), therefore limit groups are characterized as the finitely generated, fully residually free groups.

=== Constructibility ===
Any limit group is obtained by iterating constructions called free extension of centralizer, then passing to a subgroup.

Given a group $G$ and an element $c\in G$ with centralizer $Z_c \le G$, a free extension of the centralizer $Z_c$ is a free amalgamated product $G \underset{Z_c}{\ast} (Z_c \times \Z^d)$ for some $d \ge 1$. If $G$ is a limit group and $c\ne 1$, one can obtain the free extension of centralizer as a limit of the homomorphisms sending the generators of the $\Z^d$ to powers of $c$ tending to infinity in a way that removes the relations other than commutation with $c$.

== Properties ==
- Limit groups are finitely presented
- Any finitely generated subgroup of a limit group is itself a limit group (hence limit groups are coherent)
- Limit groups are commutative-transitive and satisfy the CSA property: for all $g, g', h$, if $hgh^{-1}$ and $g'$ commute, then $g$ and $h$ commute
- Limit groups are bi-orderable
- Limit groups are CAT(0) with isolated flats
- Limit groups act isometrically on real trees for which Rips machine techniques can be used
- Limit groups admit abelian JSJ decompositions

== Makanin-Razborov diagrams and equations ==
Limit groups over a free group of fixed rank form a finite diagram, the Makanin-Razborov diagram, that can be used to parametrize the solution set of a system of equations in a free group. In particular, free groups are equationally noetherian, meaning that any system of equations is equivalent to a finite system (this was already known from their linearity).

== Generalizations ==
Most of the theory for limit groups over free groups has been generalized to limit groups over Gromov-hyperbolic groups, and much of it still adapts to torsion-free toral relatively hyperbolic groups.
