= Rips machine =

In geometric group theory, the Rips machine is a method of studying the action of groups on R-trees. It was introduced in unpublished work of Eliyahu Rips in about 1991.

An R-tree is a uniquely arcwise-connected metric space in which every arc is isometric to some real interval. Rips proved the conjecture of Morgan and Shalen that any finitely generated group acting freely on an R-tree is a free product of free abelian and surface groups.

== Actions of surface groups on R-trees ==
By Bass–Serre theory, a group acting freely on a simplicial tree is free. This is no longer true for R-trees, as Morgan and Shalen showed that the fundamental groups of surfaces of Euler characteristic less than −1 also act freely on a R-trees. They proved that the fundamental group of a connected closed surface S acts freely on an R-tree if and only if S is not one of the 3 nonorientable surfaces of Euler characteristic ≥−1.

== Applications ==
The Rips machine assigns to a stable isometric action of a finitely generated group G a certain "normal form" approximation of that action by a stable action of G on a simplicial tree and hence a splitting of G in the sense of Bass–Serre theory. Group actions on real trees arise naturally in several contexts in geometric topology: for example as boundary points of the Teichmüller space (every point in the Thurston boundary of the Teichmüller space is represented by a measured geodesic lamination on the surface; this lamination lifts to the universal cover of the surface and a naturally dual object to that lift is an $\mathbb R$-tree endowed with an isometric action of the fundamental group of the surface), as Gromov-Hausdorff limits of, appropriately rescaled, Kleinian group actions, and so on. The use of $\mathbb R$-trees machinery provides substantial shortcuts in modern proofs of Thurston's hyperbolization theorem for Haken 3-manifolds. Similarly, $\mathbb R$-trees play a key role in the study of Culler-Vogtmann's Outer space as well as in other areas of geometric group theory; for example, asymptotic cones of groups often have a tree-like structure and give rise to group actions on real trees. The use of $\mathbb R$-trees, together with Bass–Serre theory, is a key tool in the work of Sela on solving the isomorphism problem for (torsion-free) word-hyperbolic groups, Sela's version of the JSJ-decomposition theory and the work of Sela on the Tarski Conjecture for free groups and the theory of limit groups.
