= Dror Bar-Natan =

Canadian-Israeli mathematician (born 1966)

- דרוֹר בָר-נָתָן
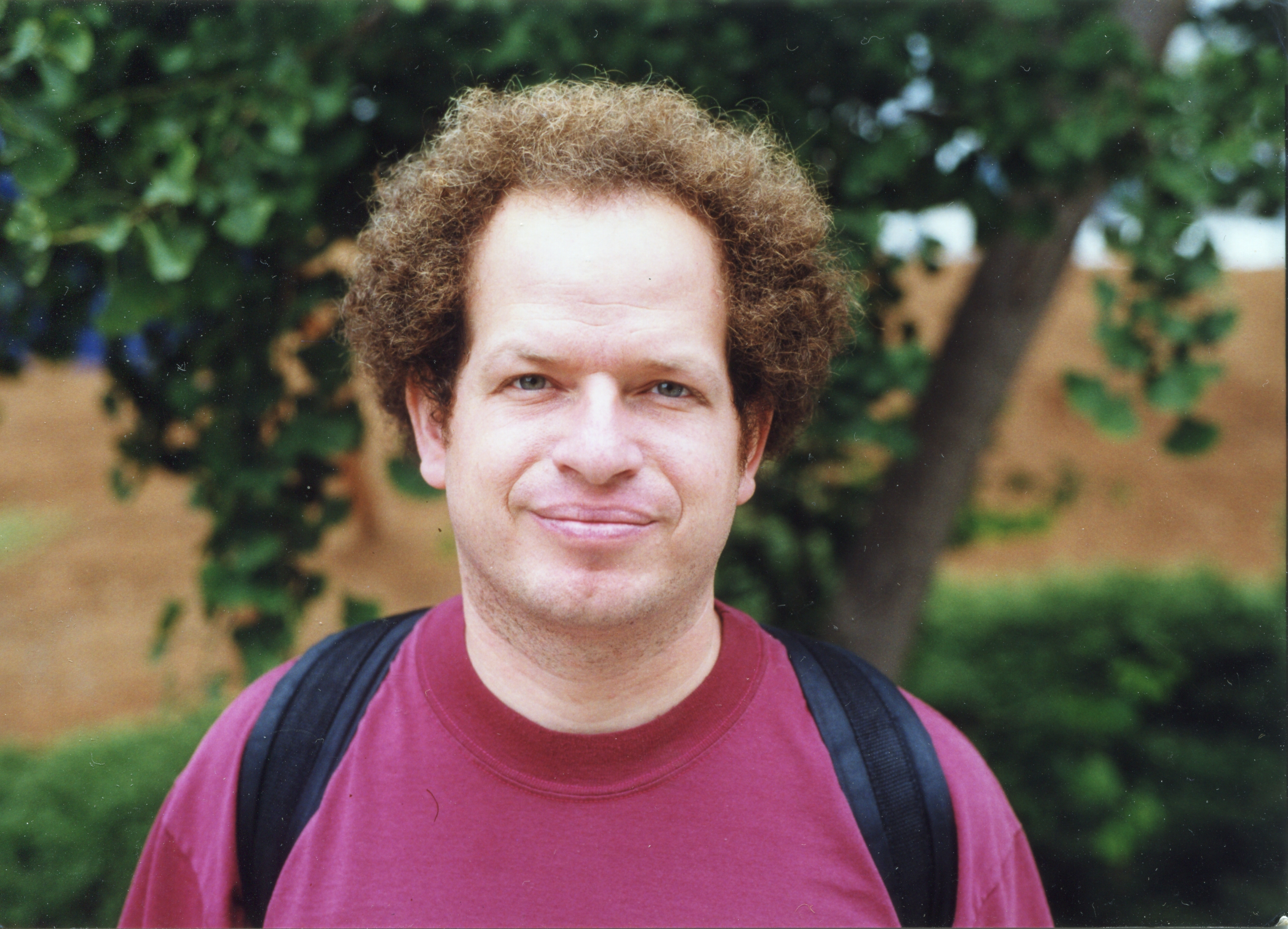
- Bar-Natan in 1999
- Born: January 30, 1966 (age 60); Israel
- Education: Tel-Aviv University (BSc); Princeton University (PhD)
- Scientific career
- Fields: Mathematics
- Workplaces: University of Toronto
- Doctoral advisor: Edward Witten
- Doctoral students: Hernando Burgos Soto
- Website: Dror Bar-Natan

Dror Bar-Natan (Hebrew: דרוֹר בָר-נָתָן; born January 30, 1966) is a Canadian-Israeli mathematician specializing in knot theory, finite type invariants, and Khovanov homology. He is currently a professor at the University of Toronto.

== Education ==
Bar-Natan earned his BSc in mathematics at Tel Aviv University in 1984. After performing his mandatory military service as a teacher, he went to study at Princeton University in 1987. He obtained his PhD in mathematics from Princeton in 1991, under the direction of physicist Edward Witten.

== Professorship ==
After holding a Benjamin Peirce Assistant Professorship at Harvard University for four years from 1991 to 1995, he returned to Israel, and became associate professor at the Hebrew University of Jerusalem. He moved to the University of Toronto in 2002, and was promoted to full professor in 2006.

== Personal life ==
Bar-Natan holds US, Israeli, and Canadian citizenship, and currently resides in Canada. Bar-Natan originally refused to take the Canadian citizenship oath because it would require him to swear allegiance to royalty. He later decided to become a citizen but publicly announced his intention to renounce the oath immediately after becoming a citizen, which he did so in front of the presiding judge at his citizenship ceremony on November 30, 2015.

From his former marriage to mathematician Yael Karshon he has two sons, Assaf and Itai.

== Research ==
In 1999, Bar-Natan collaborated on a paper with the goal of mathematically refuting claims made in The Bible Code by Michael Drosnin that hidden messages could be deciphered from within the Bible. In particular, the paper demonstrated that practically any "code" could be found within the Bible, thereby debunking Drosnin's "discovery" of specific codes. This work is outside the main scope of his academic interests, although he is known for it because of the popularity of The Bible Code.

Academically, Bar-Natan has made significant contributions to the formalization of Khovanov homology.

Bar-Natan was a member of the Editorial Board for the journal Compositio Mathematica for 10 years, until 2010.

== Selected publication ==
- Bar-Natan, Dror (1995). "On the Vassiliev knot invariants". Topology. 34 (2): 423–472. doi:10.1016/0040-9383(95)93237-2. MR 1318886.
