= Non-positive curvature =

In mathematics, spaces of non-positive curvature occur in many contexts and form a generalization of hyperbolic geometry. In the category of Riemannian manifolds, one can consider the sectional curvature of the manifold and require that this curvature be everywhere less than or equal to zero. The notion of curvature extends to the category of geodesic metric spaces, where one can use comparison triangles to quantify the curvature of a space; in this context, non-positively curved spaces are known as (locally) CAT(0) spaces.

== Riemann Surfaces ==
If $S$ is a closed, orientable Riemann surface then it follows from the Uniformization theorem that $S$ may be endowed with a complete Riemannian metric with constant Gaussian curvature of either $0$, $1$ or $-1$. As a result of the Gauss–Bonnet theorem one can determine that the surfaces which have a Riemannian metric of constant curvature $0$ $-1$ i.e. Riemann surfaces with a complete, Riemannian metric of non-positive constant curvature, are exactly those whose genus is at least $1$. The Uniformization theorem and the Gauss–Bonnet theorem can both be applied to orientable Riemann surfaces with boundary to show that those surfaces which have a non-positive Euler characteristic are exactly those which admit a Riemannian metric of non-positive curvature. There is therefore an infinite family of homeomorphism types of such surfaces whereas the Riemann sphere is the only closed, orientable Riemann surface of constant Gaussian curvature $1$.

The definition of curvature above depends upon the existence of a Riemannian metric and therefore lies in the field of geometry. However the Gauss–Bonnet theorem ensures that the topology of a surface places constraints on the complete Riemannian metrics which may be imposed on a surface so the study of metric spaces of non-positive curvature is of vital interest in both the mathematical fields of geometry and topology. Classical examples of surfaces of non-positive curvature are the Euclidean plane and flat torus (for curvature $0$) and the hyperbolic plane and pseudosphere (for curvature $-1$). For this reason these metrics as well as the Riemann surfaces which on which they lie as complete metrics are referred to as Euclidean and hyperbolic respectively.

== Generalizations ==
The characteristic features of the geometry of non-positively curved Riemann surfaces are used to generalize the notion of non-positive beyond the study of Riemann surfaces. In the study of manifolds or orbifolds of higher dimension, the notion of sectional curvature is used wherein one restricts one's attention to two-dimensional subspaces of the tangent space at a given point. In dimensions greater than $2$ the Mostow–Prasad rigidity theorem ensures that a hyperbolic manifold of finite area has a unique complete hyperbolic metric so the study of hyperbolic geometry in this setting is integral to the study of topology.

In an arbitrary geodesic metric space the notions of being Gromov hyperbolic or of being a locally CAT(0) space generalise the notion that on a Riemann surface of non-positive curvature, triangles whose sides are geodesics appear thin whereas in settings of positive curvature they appear fat. This notion of non-positive curvature allows the notion of non-positive curvature is most commonly applied to graphs and is therefore of great use in the fields of combinatorics and geometric group theory.

== See also ==
- Margulis lemma
