= Zlil Sela =

Israeli mathematician

- צליל סלע
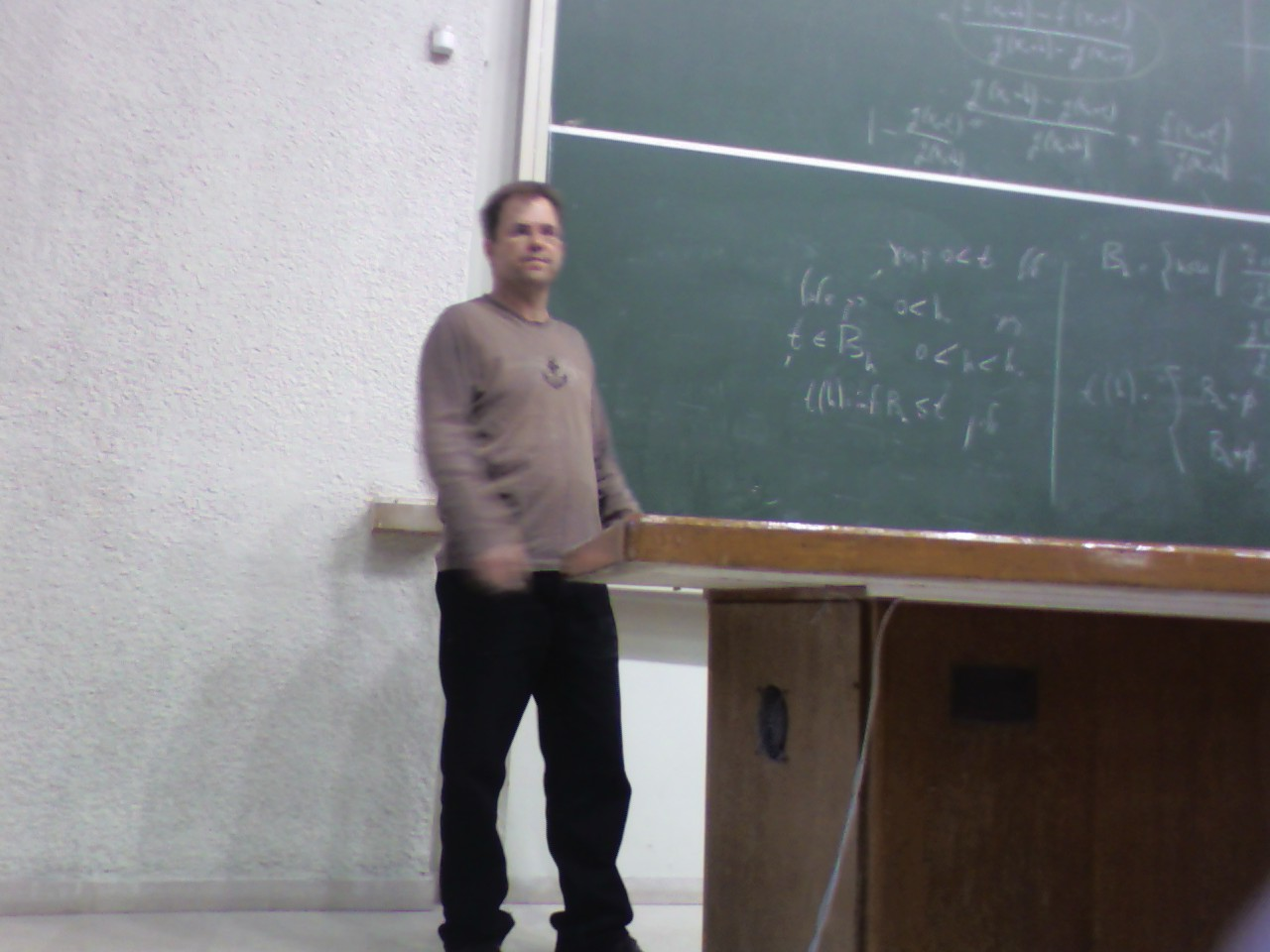
- Zlil Sela
- Education: Hebrew University of Jerusalem
- Known for: Solution of the isomorphism problem for torsion-free word-hyperbolic groups, Tarski conjecture
- Awards: Sloan Fellowship, Erdős Prize (2003), Carol Karp Prize (2008)
- Scientific career
- Fields: Mathematics
- Workplaces: Hebrew University of Jerusalem, Columbia University
- Doctoral advisor: Eliyahu Rips

Zlil Sela (Hebrew: צליל סלע) is an Israeli mathematician working in the area of geometric group theory. He is a Professor of Mathematics at the Hebrew University of Jerusalem. Sela is known for the solution of the isomorphism problem for torsion-free word-hyperbolic groups and for the solution of the Tarski conjecture about equivalence of first-order theories of finitely generated non-abelian free groups.

== Biographical data ==
Sela received his Ph.D. in 1991 from the Hebrew University of Jerusalem, where his doctoral advisor was Eliyahu Rips. Prior to his current appointment at the Hebrew University, he held an Associate Professor position at Columbia University in New York. While at Columbia, Sela won the Sloan Fellowship from the Sloan Foundation.

Sela gave an Invited Address at the 2002 International Congress of Mathematicians in Beijing. He gave a plenary talk at the 2002 annual meeting of the Association for Symbolic Logic, and he delivered an AMS Invited Address at the October 2003 meeting of the American Mathematical Society and the 2005 Tarski Lectures at the University of California at Berkeley. He was also awarded the 2003 Erdős Prize from the Israel Mathematical Union. Sela also received the 2008 Carol Karp Prize from the Association for Symbolic Logic for his work on the Tarski conjecture and on discovering and developing new connections between model theory and geometric group theory.

== Mathematical contributions ==
Sela's early important work was his solution in mid-1990s of the isomorphism problem for torsion-free word-hyperbolic groups. The machinery of group actions on real trees, developed by Eliyahu Rips, played a key role in Sela's approach. The solution of the isomorphism problem also relied on the notion of canonical representatives for elements of hyperbolic groups, introduced by Rips and Sela in a joint 1995 paper. The machinery of the canonical representatives allowed Rips and Sela to prove algorithmic solvability of finite systems of equations in torsion-free hyperbolic groups, by reducing the problem to solving equations in free groups, where the Makanin–Razborov algorithm can be applied. The technique of canonical representatives was later generalized by Dahmani to the case of relatively hyperbolic groups and played a key role in the solution of the isomorphism problem for toral relatively hyperbolic groups.

In his work on the isomorphism problem Sela also introduced and developed the notion of a JSJ-decomposition for word-hyperbolic groups, motivated by the notion of a JSJ decomposition for 3-manifolds. A JSJ-decomposition is a representation of a word-hyperbolic group as the fundamental group of a graph of groups which encodes in a canonical way all possible splittings over infinite cyclic subgroups. The idea of JSJ-decomposition was later extended by Rips and Sela to torsion-free finitely presented groups and this work gave rise a systematic development of the JSJ-decomposition theory with many further extensions and generalizations by other mathematicians. Sela applied a combination of his JSJ-decomposition and real tree techniques to prove that torsion-free word-hyperbolic groups are Hopfian. This result and Sela's approach were later generalized by others to finitely generated subgroups of hyperbolic groups and to the setting of relatively hyperbolic groups.

Sela's most important work came in early 2000s when he produced a solution to a famous Tarski conjecture. Namely, in a long series of papers, he proved that any two non-abelian finitely generated free groups have the same first-order theory. His work relied on applying his earlier JSJ-decomposition and real tree techniques as well as developing new ideas and machinery of "algebraic geometry" over free groups.

Sela pushed this work further to study first-order theory of arbitrary torsion-free word-hyperbolic groups and to characterize all groups that are elementarily equivalent to (that is, have the same first-order theory as) a given torsion-free word-hyperbolic group. In particular, his work implies that if a finitely generated group G is elementarily equivalent to a word-hyperbolic group then G is word-hyperbolic as well.

Sela also proved that the first-order theory of a finitely generated free group is stable in the model-theoretic sense, providing a brand-new and qualitatively different source of examples for the stability theory.

An alternative solution for the Tarski conjecture has been presented by Olga Kharlampovich and Alexei Myasnikov.

The work of Sela on first-order theory of free and word-hyperbolic groups substantially influenced the development of geometric group theory, in particular by stimulating the development and the study of the notion of limit groups and of relatively hyperbolic groups.

== Sela's classification theorem ==
Theorem. Two non-abelian torsion-free hyperbolic groups are elementarily equivalent if and only if their cores are isomorphic.

== Published work ==
- Sela, Zlil; Rips, Eliyahu (1995), "Canonical representatives and equations in hyperbolic groups", Inventiones Mathematicae, 120 (3): 489–512, Bibcode:1995InMat.120..489R, doi:10.1007/BF01241140, MR 1334482, S2CID 121404710
- Sela, Zlil (1995), "The isomorphism problem for hyperbolic groups", Annals of Mathematics, Second Series, 141 (2): 217–283, doi:10.2307/2118520, JSTOR 2118520, MR 1324134
- Sela, Zlil (1997), "Structure and rigidity in (Gromov) hyperbolic groups and discrete groups in rank 1 Lie groups. II.", Geometric and Functional Analysis, 7 (3): 561–593, doi:10.1007/s000390050019, MR 1466338, S2CID 120486267
- Sela, Zlil; Rips, Eliyahu (1997), "Cyclic splittings of finitely presented groups and the canonical JSJ decomposition", Annals of Mathematics, Second Series, 146 (1): 53–109, doi:10.2307/2951832, JSTOR 2951832, MR 1469317
- Sela, Zlil (1997), "Acylindrical accessibility for groups", Inventiones Mathematicae, 129 (3): 527–565, Bibcode:1997InMat.129..527S, doi:10.1007/s002220050172, S2CID 122548154 (Sela's theorem on acylindrical accessibility for groups)
- Sela, Zlil (2001), "Diophantine geometry over groups. I. Makanin-Razborov diagrams" (PDF), Publications Mathématiques de l'IHÉS, 93 (1): 31–105, doi:10.1007/s10240-001-8188-y, MR 1863735, S2CID 51799226
- Sela, Zlil (2003), "Diophantine geometry over groups. II. Completions, closures and formal solutions", Israel Journal of Mathematics, 134 (1): 173–254, doi:10.1007/BF02787407, MR 1972179
- Sela, Zlil (2006), "Diophantine geometry over groups. VI. The elementary theory of a free group", Geometric and Functional Analysis, 16 (3): 707–730, doi:10.1007/s00039-006-0565-8, MR 2238945, S2CID 123197664

== See also ==
- Geometric group theory
- Stable theory
- Free group
- Word-hyperbolic group
- Group isomorphism problem
- Real trees
- JSJ decomposition
