= Hedgehog space =

Topological space made of a set of spines joined at a point

A hedgehog space with a large but finite number of spines

In mathematics, a hedgehog space is a topological space consisting of a set of spines joined at a point.

For any cardinal number $\kappa$, the $\kappa$-hedgehog space is formed by taking the disjoint union of $\kappa$ real unit intervals identified at the origin (though its topology is not the quotient topology, but that defined by the metric below). Each unit interval is referred to as one of the hedgehog's spines. A $\kappa$-hedgehog space is sometimes called a hedgehog space of spininess $\kappa$.

The hedgehog space is a metric space, when endowed with the hedgehog metric $d(x,y)=\left| x - y \right|$ if $x$ and $y$ lie in the same spine, and by $d(x,y)=\left|x\right| + \left|y\right|$ if $x$ and $y$ lie in different spines. Although their disjoint union makes the origins of the intervals distinct, the metric makes them equivalent by assigning them 0 distance.

Hedgehog spaces are examples of real trees.

== Paris metric ==
The metric on the plane in which the distance between any two points is their Euclidean distance when the two points belong to a ray through the origin, and is otherwise the sum of the distances of the two points from the origin, is sometimes called the Paris metric because navigation in this metric resembles that in the radial street plan of Paris: for almost all pairs of points, the shortest path passes through the center. The Paris metric, restricted to the unit disk, is a hedgehog space where K is the cardinality of the continuum.

== Kowalsky's theorem ==
Kowalsky's theorem, named after Hans-Joachim Kowalsky, states that any metrizable space of weight $\kappa$ can be represented as a topological subspace of the product of countably many $\kappa$-hedgehog spaces.

== See also ==
- Comb space
- Long line (topology)
- Rose (topology)

== Other sources ==
- Arkhangelskii, A.V.; Pontryagin, L.S. (1990). General Topology. Vol. I. Berlin, DE: Springer-Verlag. ISBN 3-540-18178-4.
- Steen, L.A.; Seebach, J.A. Jr. (1970). Counter-Examples in Topology. Holt, Rinehart, and Winston.
- Torres, Igor (2017). "A tale of three hedgehogs". arXiv:1711.08656 [math.GN].
