= Olga Kharlampovich =

Canadian mathematician

- Born: March 25, 1960 (age 66); Sverdlovsk, USSR
- Education: Leningrad State University (PhD)
- Occupation: Mathematician
- Known for: Her solution of the Novikov–Adian problem

Olga Kharlampovich (born March 25, 1960, in Sverdlovsk) is a Russian-Canadian mathematician working in the area of group theory. She is the Mary P. Dolciani Professor of Mathematics at the CUNY Graduate Center and Hunter College.

== Contributions ==
Kharlampovich is known for her example of a finitely presented 3-step solvable group with unsolvable word problem (solution of the Novikov–Adian problem) (Note: O. Kharlampovich, "A finitely presented solvable group with unsolvable word problem", Izvest. Ak. Nauk, Ser. Mat. (Soviet Math., Izvestia) 45, 4 (1981), pages 852–873.) and for the solution together with A. Myasnikov of the Tarski conjecture (from 1945) about equivalence of first-order theories of finitely generated non-abelian free groups (Note: O. Kharlampovich, and A. Myasnikov. "Elementary theory of free non-abelian groups." Journal of Algebra, volume 302 (2006), no. 2, pages 451–552.) (also solved by Zlil Sela) and decidability of this common theory.

Algebraic geometry for groups, introduced by Baumslag, Myasnikov, Remeslennikov, and Kharlampovich (Note: O. Kharlampovich, A. Myasnikov, Irreducible affine varieties over a free group. I: Irreducibility of quadratic equations and nullstellensatz, Journal of Algebra, V. 200, pages 492–516 (1998),) (Note: O. Kharlampovich, A. Myasnikov, Irreducible affine varieties over a free group. II: Systems in row-echelon form and description of residually free groups, Journal of Algebra, V. 200, pages 517–570 (1998).) became one of the new research directions in combinatorial group theory.

== Education and career ==
She received her Ph.D. from the Leningrad State University in 1984 (her doctoral advisor was Lev Shevrin) and Russian “Doctor of Science” in 1990 from the Moscow Steklov Institute of Mathematics.

Prior to her current appointment at CUNY, she held a position at Ural State University, Ekaterinburg, Russia, and was a Professor of Mathematics at McGill University, Montreal, Canada, where she had been working since 1990.

As of August 2011 she moved to Hunter College of the City University of New York as the Mary P. Dolciani Professor of Mathematics, where she is the inaugural holder of the first endowed professorship in the Department of Mathematics and Statistics.

== Recognition ==
For her undergraduate work on the Novikov–Adian problem she was awarded in 1981 a Medal from the Soviet Academy of Sciences. She received an Ural Mathematical Society Award in 1984 for the solution of the Malcev–Kargapolov problem posed in 1965 about the algorithmic decidability of the universal theory of the class of all finite nilpotent groups.

Kharlampovich was awarded in 1996 the Krieger–Nelson Prize of the Canadian Mathematical Society for her work on algorithmic problems in varieties of groups and Lie algebras (the description of this work can be found in the survey paper with Sapir (Note: O. Kharlampovich and M. Sapir, Algorithmic problems in varieties, a survey, International Journal of Algebra and Computation, (1995), # 12, pages 379–602.) and on the prize web site). She was awarded the 2015 Mal'cev Prize for the series of works on fundamental model-theoretic problems in algebra.

She was elected a Fellow of the American Mathematical Society in the 2020 class "for contributions to algorithmic and geometric group theory, algebra and logic."
