= Robert Haralick =

Robert M. Haralick (born 1943) is Distinguished Professor in Computer Science at Graduate Center of the City University of New York (CUNY). Haralick is one of the leading figures in computer vision, pattern recognition, and image analysis. He is a Fellow of the Institute of Electrical and Electronics Engineers (IEEE) and a Fellow and past president of the International Association for Pattern Recognition. Professor Haralick is the King-Sun Fu Prize winner of 2016, "for contributions in image analysis, including remote sensing, texture analysis, mathematical morphology, consistent labeling, and system performance evaluation".

== Biography ==
Haralick was born in Brooklyn, New York. Haralick received a B.A. degree in mathematics from the University of Kansas in 1964, a B.S. degree in electrical engineering in 1966, and a M.S. degree in electrical engineering in 1967. In 1969, after completing his Ph.D. at the University of Kansas, he joined the faculty of the electrical engineering department, serving as professor from 1975 to 1978. In 1979 Haralick joined the electrical engineering department at Virginia Polytechnic Institute and State University, where he was a professor and director of the spatial data analysis laboratory.

From 1984 to 1986 Haralick served as vice president of research at Machine Vision International, Ann Arbor, Michigan. Haralick occupied the Boeing Clairmont Egtvedt Professorship in the department of electrical engineering at the University of Washington from 1986 through 2000. At University of Washington, Haralick was an adjunct professor in the computer science department and the bioengineering department.

In 2000 Haralick accepted a Distinguished Professorship position at the computer science department of the Graduate Center of the City University of New York.

== Contributions ==
Haralick began his work as one of the principal investigators of the NASA ERTS satellite data doing remote sensing image analysis.

Haralick has made a series of contributions in the field of computer vision. In the high-level vision area, he has worked on inferring 3D geometry from one or more perspective projection views. He has also identified a variety of vision problems which are special cases of the consistent labeling problem. His papers on consistent labeling, arrangements, relation homomorphism, matching, and tree search translate some specific computer vision problems to the more general combinatorial consistent labeling problem and then discuss the theory of the look-ahead operators that speed up the tree search. The most basic of these is called Forward Checking. This gives a framework for the control structure required in high-level vision problems. He has also extended the forward-checking tree search technique to propositional logic.

In the low-and mid-level areas, Haralick has worked in image texture analysis using spatial gray tone co-occurrence texture features. These features have been used with success on biological cell images, x-ray images, satellite images, aerial images and many other kinds of images taken at small and large scales. In the feature detection area, Haralick has developed the facet model for image processing. The facet model states that many low-level image processing operations can be interpreted relative to what the processing does to the estimated underlying gray tone intensity surface of which the given image is a sampled noisy version. The facet papers develop techniques for edge detection, line detection, noise removal, peak and pit detection, as well as a variety of other topographic gray tone surface features.

Haralick's work in shape analysis and extraction uses the techniques of mathematical morphology. He has developed the morphological sampling theorem which establishes a sound shape/size basis for the focus of attention mechanisms which can process image data in a multiresolution mode, thereby making some of the image feature extraction processes execute more efficiently. He has also developed recursive morphological algorithms for the computation of opening and closing transforms. The recursive algorithms permit all possible sized openings or closings for a given structuring element to be computed in constant time per pixel. He also developed statistical morphological methodologies for image analysis and noise removal. and noise removal

In the area of document image understanding, Haralick is responsible for the development of comprehensive ground-truthed databases consisting of over 1500 document images, most in English and some in Japanese. The databases are issued on CD-ROMs and are used all around the world by people developing character recognition methodologies and techniques for document image structural decomposition. He has developed algorithms for document image skew angle estimation, zone delineation, and word and text line bounding box delineation.

In a series of papers, Haralick has helped influence the computer vision community to be more sensitive to the needs of computer vision performance characterization and covariance propagation for without this kind of analysis Computer Vision has no robust theory.

Haralick has contributed to the medical image analysis area particularly working with X-ray ventriculargrams . and echocardiography, These papers developed techniques to identify and delineate anatomically accurate boundaries for the left ventricle of the heart.

His most recent work is in the pattern recognition area, particularly in the manifold clustering of high-dimensional data sets, the application of pattern recognition to mathematical combinatorial problems and in the area of Torah codes popularly called Bible codes. In this area he has co-authored a book with Eliyahu Rips, one of the coauthors of the original Statistical Sciences paper. Haralick's research has helped develop sophisticated algorithmic and statistical methodology for Torah code experiments, methodology that he claims can differentiate between the tables that are depicted as encodings in books like Moby Dick and War and Peace from those encodings that occur in the Torah text.

Haralick is a Fellow of IEEE for his contributions in computer vision and image processing and a Fellow of the International Association for Pattern Recognition (IAPR) for his contributions in pattern recognition, image processing, and for service to IAPR. He served as president of IAPR from 1996 to 1998. He has served on the editorial board of "IEEE Transactions on Pattern Analysis and Machine Intelligence" and has been the computer vision area editor for Communications of the ACM and as an associate editor for Computer Vision, Graphics, and Image Processing, The IEEE Transactions on Image Processing and Pattern Recognition. He served on the editorial board of Real Time Imaging and the editorial board of Electronic Imaging. His publications include over 570 archival papers, book chapters, conference proceedings and books. The science citation index lists over 6300 references to his papers.

Haralick has been recognized for his academic research in the Marquis Who's Who books. He is listed in the current editions for Who's Who in the East, Who's Who in America, and Who's Who in the World.

== Works ==
- Haralick, Robert M.; Thomas Creese (1978). Differential Equations For Engineers. McGraw Hill Book Company. ISBN 0-07-013510-X.
- Haralick, Robert M (1995). Inner Meaning of the Hebrew Letters. Jason Aronson. ISBN 1-56821-356-5.
- Haralick, Robert M.; Shapiro, Linda G. (2002). Computer and Robot Vision (Volume I). Addison Wesley Longman.
- Haralick, Robert M.; Shapiro, Linda G. (2002). Computer and Robot Vision (Volume II). Addison Wesley Longman. ISBN 0-201-56943-4.
- Haralick, Robert M.; Rips, Eliyahu; Glazerson, Matiyahu (2005). Torah Codes: A Glimpse into the Infinite. Mazal & Bracha Publishing. ISBN 0-9740493-9-5.

== See also ==
- Optical character recognition
- Robotics
