= Bible code =

Purported set of secret messages encoded within the Hebrew text of the Torah

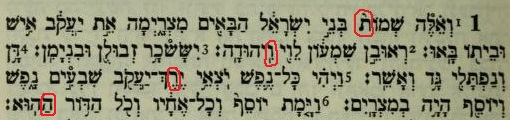
Exodus 1:1–6. Biblia Hebraica from Kittel's edition (BHK) 1909. Four letters, fifty letters apart, starting from the first taw on the first verse, form the word תורה (Torah).

The Bible code (Hebrew: הצופן התנ״כי, hatzofen hatanachi), also known as the Torah code, is a purported set of encoded words within a Hebrew text of the Torah that, according to proponents, has predicted significant historical events. The statistical likelihood of the Bible code arising by chance has been thoroughly researched, and it is now widely considered to be statistically insignificant, as similar phenomena can be observed in any sufficiently lengthy text. Although Bible codes have been postulated and studied for centuries, the subject has been popularized in modern times by Michael Drosnin's book The Bible Code (1997) and the movie The Omega Code (1999).

Some tests purportedly showing statistically significant codes in the Bible were published as a "challenging puzzle" in a peer-reviewed academic journal in 1994, which was pronounced "solved" in a subsequent 1999 paper published in the same journal.

== Overview ==
Discussion around one specific steganographic method became widespread in 1994 when Doron Witztum, Eliyahu Rips and Yoav Rosenberg published a paper, "Equidistant Letter Sequences in the Book of Genesis", in the scientific journal Statistical Science. The paper, which was presented by the journal as a "challenging puzzle", presented what appeared to be strong statistical evidence that biographical information about famous rabbis was encoded in the text of the Book of Genesis, centuries before those rabbis lived.

== Equidistant letter sequence method ==
The primary method by which purportedly meaningful messages have been extracted is the Equidistant Letter Sequence (ELS), also referred to as dilug (דילוג, 'skipping [of letters]'). Letters are selected based on a starting point and counting every nth letter based on a given 'skip number' in a given direction. For example, taking every fourth letter in the phrase "this sentence fits an ELS", when read backwards and ignoring spaces, derives the word 'Safest'.

Example of the ELS method showing an arrangement of the letters from Genesis 26:5–10 in a 21-column grid to derive the words "Bible" and "code".

In some cases, multiple terms may be derived from an 'ELS letter array' (text in a grid, with the same number of letters in each line). In the example provided, part of the King James Version's rendering of Genesis (26:5–10) is shown with 21 letters per line, showing ELSs for "Bible" and "code".

=== Extensions ===
Once a specific word has been found using the ELS method, other words are sought based on the same letter spacing. Code proponents Haralick and Rips have published an example of a longer, extended ELS, which reads, "Destruction I will call you; cursed is Bin Laden and revenge is to the Messiah".

Proponents claim that such ELS extensions that form phrases or sentences have statistical significance, maintaining that the longer the extended ELS, the less likely it is to be the result of chance. Critics reply, as in the Skeptical Inquirer deconstruction of 1997, that the longer ELS is in fact effectively nothing more than further increased number of permutations, employing a massive application of the look-elsewhere effect.

== History ==
=== Early history ===
The 13th-century Spanish rabbi Bachya ben Asher described an ELS in the Bible. His four-letter example related to the traditional zero-point of the Hebrew calendar. Over the following centuries there are hints that the ELS technique was known, e.g. in Pardes Rimonim of the 16th century mystic Moshe Cordovero.

In the early 20th century, Michael Ber Weissmandl was inspired by the writings of Bachya and is said to have written out the text of the Torah by hand in grid patterns to recognize divine messages. His manual methods were limited before the computer era. After his 1957 death his students published his findings in the book Torat Chemed (Torah of Delight) in 1958.

In the 1980s, some discoveries of Israeli school teacher Avraham Oren came to the attention of the mathematician Eliyahu Rips at the Hebrew University of Jerusalem. Rips then took up the study together with his religious studies partners Doron Witztum and Alexander Rotenberg, among several others.

=== Rips and Witztum ===
Rips and Witztum and Yoav Rosenberg designed computer software for the ELS technique and subsequently found many examples. About 1985, they decided to carry out a formal test, and the "Great rabbis experiment" was born. This experiment tested the hypothesis that ELS's of the names of famous rabbinic personalities and their respective birth and death dates form a more compact arrangement than could be explained by chance. Their definition of "compact" was complex but, roughly, two ELSs were compactly arranged if they can be displayed together in a small window. When Rips et al. carried out the experiment, the data was measured and found to be statistically significant, supporting their hypothesis.

The "great rabbis experiment" went through several iterations, and was eventually published in 1994, in the peer-reviewed journal Statistical Science. The editorial board was highly skeptical due to the fact that computers can be used to "mine" data for patterns that intuitively seem surprising but upon careful analysis are found to be statistically insignificant. While they did find a number of possible sources of error, they were unable to find anyone willing to put in the substantial time and energy required to properly reanalyze the data. However, they did find it intriguing, and therefore decided to offer it as a "challenging puzzle" for anyone interested in doing so. An unintended result of this was that outsiders mistook this as a confirmation of the paper's claims.

=== Other experiments ===
Another experiment, in which the names of the famous rabbis were matched against the places of their births and deaths (rather than the dates), was conducted in 1997 by Harold Gans, former Senior Cryptologic Mathematician for the United States National Security Agency.

Again, the results were interpreted as being meaningful and thus suggestive of a more than chance result. These Bible codes became known to the public primarily due to the American journalist Michael Drosnin, whose book The Bible Code (1997) was a best-seller in many countries. Rips issued a public statement that he did not support Drosnin's work or conclusions; even Gans has stated that, although the book says the codes in the Torah can be used to predict future events, "This is absolutely unfounded. There is no scientific or mathematical basis for such a statement, and the reasoning used to come to such a conclusion in the book is logically flawed." In 2002, Drosnin published a second book on the same subject, called Bible Code II: the Countdown.

The Jewish outreach group Aish HaTorah employs Bible codes in their Discovery Seminars to persuade secular Jews of the divinity of the Torah, and to encourage them to trust in traditional Orthodox Jewish teachings. Use of Bible code techniques also spread into certain Christian circles, especially in the United States. The main early proponents were Yakov Rambsel, who is a Messianic Jew, and Grant Jeffrey. Another Bible code technique was developed in 1997 by Dean Coombs (also Christian). Various pictograms are claimed to be formed by words and sentences using ELS.

Since 2000, physicist Nathan Jacobi, an agnostic Jew, and engineer Moshe Aharon Shak, an orthodox Jew, claim to have discovered hundreds of examples of lengthy, extended ELSs. The number of extended ELSs at various lengths is compared with those expected from a non-encoded text, as determined by a formula from Markov chain theory.

== Criticism ==
The precise order of consonantal letters represented in the Hebrew Masoretic Text is not consistent across manuscripts in any period. It is known from earlier versions, such as the Dead Sea Scrolls, that the number of letters was not constant even in the first centuries CE. The Bible code theory thus does not seem to account for these variations.

Similar predictions have been obtained on the text of the novel Moby-Dick, which would require the reader, applying the same principles, to believe that the novel was divinely inspired.

=== Criticism of the original paper ===
In 1999, Australian mathematician Brendan McKay, Israeli mathematicians Dror Bar-Natan and Gil Kalai, and Israeli psychologist Maya Bar-Hillel (collectively known as "MBBK") published a paper in Statistical Science, in which they argued that the case of Witztum, Rips and Rosenberg (WRR) was "fatally defective, and that their result merely reflects on the choices made in designing their experiment and collecting the data for it." The MBBK paper was reviewed anonymously by four professional statisticians prior to publication. In the introduction to the paper, Robert Kass, the Editor of the Journal who previously had described the WRR paper as a "challenging puzzle" wrote that "considering the work of McKay, Bar-Natan, Kalai and Bar-Hillel as a whole it indeed appears, as they conclude, that the puzzle has been solved".

From their observations, MBBK created an alternative hypothesis to explain the "puzzle" of how the codes were discovered. MBBK's argument was not strictly mathematical, rather it asserted that the WRR authors and contributors had intentionally:

1. Selected the names and/or dates in advance, and;
2. Designed their experiments to match their selection, thereby achieving their "desired" result.

The MBBK paper argued that the ELS experiment is extraordinarily sensitive to very small changes in the spellings of appellations, and the WRR result "merely reflects on the choices made in designing their experiment and collecting the data for it."

The MBBK paper demonstrated that this "tuning", when combined with what MBBK asserted was available "wiggle" room, was capable of generating a result similar to WRR's Genesis result in a Hebrew translation of War and Peace. Bar-Hillel subsequently summarized the MBBK view that the WRR paper was a hoax, an intentionally and carefully designed "magic trick".

=== Replies to MBBK's criticisms ===
==== Harold Gans ====
Harold Gans, a former cryptanalyst at the National Security Agency, argued that MBBK's hypothesis implies a conspiracy between WRR and their co-contributors to fraudulently tune the appellations in advance. Gans argues that the conspiracy must include Doron Witztum, Eliyahu Rips, and S. Z. Havlin, because they all say Havlin compiled the appellations independently. Gans argues further that such a conspiracy must include the multiple rabbis who have written a letter confirming the accuracy of Havlin's list. Finally, argues Gans, such a conspiracy must also include the multiple participants of the cities experiment conducted by Gans (which includes Gans himself). Gans concludes that "the number of people necessarily involved in [the conspiracy] will stretch the credulity of any reasonable person." Gans further argued that while "the mathematical issues are difficult for non-mathematicians to comprehend, I can summarize as follows: Professor McKay and his colleagues never claimed to have discovered real codes in those non-Torah texts. Their only "successful" results were obtained by deliberately rigging the experiment in such a way that the layman wouldn't recognize the mathematical flaws."

Brendan McKay has replied that he and his colleagues have never accused Havlin or Gans of participating in a conspiracy. Instead, says McKay, Havlin likely did what WRR's early preprints stated he did, in providing "valuable advices". Similarly, McKay accepts Gans's statements that Gans did not prepare the data for his cities experiment himself. McKay concludes that "there is only ONE person who needs to have been involved in knowing fakery, and a handful of his disciples who must be involved in the cover-up (perhaps with good intent)."

==== WRR authors ====
The WRR authors issued a series of responses regarding the claims of MBBK, including the claim that no such tuning did or even could have taken place. An earlier WRR response to a request by MBBK authors presented results from additional experiments that used the specific "alternate" name and date formats which MBBK suggested had been intentionally avoided by WRR. Using MBBK's alternates, the results WRR returned showed equivalent or better support for the existence of the codes, and so challenged the "wiggle room" assertion of MBBK. In the wake of the WRR response, author Bar-Natan issued a formal statement of non-response. After a series of exchanges with McKay and Bar-Hillel, WRR author Witztum responded in a new paper claiming that McKay had used smoke screen tactics in creating several straw man arguments, and thereby avoided the points made by WRR authors refuting MBBK. Witztum also claimed that, upon interviewing a key independent expert contracted by McKay for the MBBK paper, some experiments performed for MBBK had validated, rather than refuted, the original WRR findings. Witzum questioned why MBBK had expunged these results. McKay replied to these claims.

No publication in a peer-reviewed scientific journal has appeared refuting MBBK's paper.

==== Robert Aumann ====
Robert Aumann, a game theorist and winner of the Nobel Prize in Economics in 2005, has followed the Bible code research and controversy for many years. He wrote:

Though the basic thesis of the research seems wildly improbable, for many years I thought that an ironclad case had been made for the codes; I did not see how 'cheating' could have been possible. Then came the work of the 'opponents' (see, for example, McKay, Bar-Natan, Bar-Hillel and Kalai, Statistical Science 14 (1999), 149–173). Though this work did not convince me that the data had been manipulated, it did convince me that it could have been; that manipulation was technically possible.

Following an analysis of the experiment and the dynamics of the controversy, stating for example that "almost everybody included [in the controversy] made up their mind early in the game", Aumann concluded:

A priori, the thesis of the Codes research seems wildly improbable ... Research conducted under my own supervision failed to confirm the existence of the codes – though it also did not establish their non-existence. So I must return to my a priori estimate, that the Codes phenomenon is improbable".

==== Robert Haralick ====
Robert Haralick, a professor of computer science at the City University of New York, has checked the Bible Code for many years and became convinced of its validity. He contributed a new experiment, checking whether, besides the minimal ELS – in which it was known that WRR's list was successful in Genesis and MBBK's list was successful in War and Peace – there were other, non-minimal ELSs where there is convergence between the rabbis' names and their respective dates. This had the effect of checking convergence found at 2nd minimal ELSs, 3rd minimal ELSs and so on. According to Haralick, the results were impressive; WRR's list was successful until the 20th minimal ELS, whereas MBBK's list failed after the 2nd minimal ELS. Haralick lectured on the subject in front of the participants of the International Conference on Pattern Recognition in 2006.

=== Criticism of Michael Drosnin ===
Journalist Drosnin's books have been criticized by some who believe the Bible code is real but that it cannot predict the future. On Drosnin's claim of Yitzhak Rabin's assassination, Drosnin wrote in his book "The Bible Code" (1997) that "Yigal Amir could not be found in advance". Critics have noted a huge error in the "code" Drosnin claimed to have found: Drosnin misused the Biblical verse Deuteronomy 4:42. Scholars note; "For example, citing again the passage intersecting with Rabin: that passage is from Deuteronomy 4:42, but Drosnin ignores the words immediately following "a murderer who will murder." What comes next is the phrase "unwittingly" (biveli da'at). This is because the verse deals with the cities of refuge where accidental killers can find asylum. In this case, then, the message would refer to an accidental killing of (or by) Rabin and it would therefore be wrong. Another message (p. 17) supposedly contains a "complete" description of the terrorist bombing of a bus in Jerusalem on February 25, 1996. It includes the phrase "fire, great noise," but overlooks the fact that the letters which make up those two words are actually part of a larger phrase from Genesis 35:4 which says: "under the terebinth that was near Shechem." If the phrase does tell of a bus bombing, why not take it to indicate that it would be in Nablus, the site of ancient Shechem?"

Drosnin also made a number of claims and alleged predictions that have since failed. Among the most important, Drosnin clearly states in his book "The Bible Code II", published on December 2, 2002, that there was to be a World War involving an "atomic holocaust" that would allegedly be the end of the world. Another claim Drosnin makes in "The Bible Code II" is that the nation of Libya would develop weapons of mass destruction which would then be given to terrorists who would then use them to attack the West (specifically the United States). In reality, Libya improved relations with the West in 2003 and gave up all their existing weapons of mass destruction programs. A final claim Drosnin made in "The Bible Code II" was that Palestinian Authority leader Yasser Arafat would allegedly be assassinated by being shot to death by gunmen which Drosnin specifically stated would be from the Palestinian Hamas movement. This prediction by Drosnin also failed, as Yasser Arafat died on November 11, 2004 of what was later declared to be natural causes (specifically a stroke brought on by an unknown infection).

== See also ==
- Alignments of random points – Phenomenon in statistics
- Biblical archaeology – Archaeological sub-discipline
- Bibliomancy – Use of books in divination
- Confirmation bias – Bias confirming existing attitudes
- English Qaballa – English Qaballa system of James Lees
- Gematria – Numerological practice of reading a word or phrase as a number
- Isopsephy – Numerological connection between words whose letters' number values have equal sums
- Jewish mystical exegesis
- Numerology – Mystical properties of numbers
- Quran code – Hypothetical mathematical code in the Quran
- Ramsey theory – Branch of mathematical combinatorics
- Shemhamphorasch – Hidden name of God in Judaism and occultism
- Synchronicity – Jungian concept of the meaningfulness of acausal coincidences
- Theomatics – Numerological study of the Christian Bible
