= Real tree =

In mathematics, real trees (also called $\mathbb R$-trees) are a class of metric spaces generalising simplicial trees. They arise naturally in many mathematical contexts, in particular geometric group theory and probability theory. They are also the simplest examples of Gromov hyperbolic spaces.

== Definition and examples ==
=== Formal definition ===
A triangle in a real tree

A metric space $X$ is a real tree if it is a geodesic space where every triangle is a tripod. That is, for every three points $x, y, \rho \in X$ there exists a point $c = x \wedge y$ such that the geodesic segments $[\rho,x], [\rho,y]$ intersect in the segment $[\rho,c]$ and also $c \in [x,y]$. This definition is equivalent to $X$ being a "zero-hyperbolic space" in the sense of Gromov (all triangles are "zero-thin").

Real trees can also be characterised by a topological property. A metric space $X$ is a real tree if for any pair of points $x, y \in X$ all topological embeddings $\sigma$ of the segment $[0,1]$ into $X$ such that $\sigma(0) = x, \, \sigma(1) = y$ have the same image (which is then a geodesic segment from $x$ to $y$).

=== Simple examples ===
- If $X$ is a connected graph with the combinatorial metric then it is a real tree if and only if it is a tree (i.e. it has no cycles). Such a tree is often called a simplicial tree. They are characterised by the following topological property: a real tree $T$ is simplicial if and only if the set of singular points of $X$ (points whose complement in $X$ has three or more connected components) is closed and discrete in $X$.
- The $\mathbb R$-tree obtained in the following way is nonsimplicial. Start with the interval [0, 2] and glue, for each positive integer n, an interval of length 1/n to the point 1 − 1/n in the original interval. The set of singular points is discrete, but fails to be closed since 1 is an ordinary point in this $\mathbb R$-tree. Gluing an interval to 1 would result in a closed set of singular points at the expense of discreteness.
- The Paris metric makes the plane into a real tree. It is defined as follows: one fixes an origin $P$, and if two points are on the same ray from $P$, their distance is defined as the Euclidean distance. Otherwise, their distance is defined to be the sum of the Euclidean distances of these two points to the origin $P$.
- The plane under the Paris metric is an example of a hedgehog space, a collection of line segments joined at a common endpoint. Any such space is a real tree.

== Characterizations ==
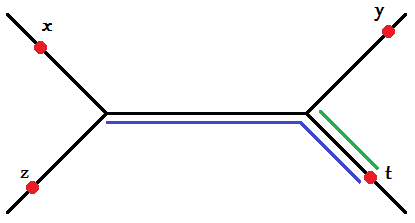
Visualisation of the four points condition and the 0-hyperbolicity. In green: $(x,y)_t=(y,z)_t$ ; in blue: $(x,z)_t$.

Here are equivalent characterizations of real trees which can be used as definitions:

1) (similar to trees as graphs) A real tree is a geodesic metric space which contains no subset homeomorphic to a circle.

2) A real tree is a connected metric space $(X,d)$ which has the four points condition (see figure):

For all $x,y,z,t\in X,$ $d(x,y)+d(z,t)\leq \max[d(x,z)+d(y,t)\,;\, d(x,t)+d(y,z)]$.

3) A real tree is a connected 0-hyperbolic metric space (see figure). Formally,

For all $x,y,z,t\in X,$ $(x,y)_t\geq \min [ (x,z)_t\, ; \, (y,z)_t ],$

where $(x,y)_t$ denotes the Gromov product of $x$ and $y$ with respect to $t$, that is, $\textstyle\frac 1 2 \left( d(x, t) + d(y, t) - d(x, y) \right).$

4) (similar to the characterization of plane trees by their contour process). Consider a positive excursion of a function. In other words, let $e$ be a continuous real-valued function and $[a,b]$ an interval such that $e(a)=e(b)=0$ and $e(t)>0$ for $t\in ]a,b[$.

For $x, y\in [a,b]$, $x\leq y$, define a pseudometric and an equivalence relation with:

$$d_e( x, y) := e(x)+e(y)-2\min(e(z)\, ;z\in[x,y]),$$

$$x\sim_e y \Leftrightarrow d_e(x,y)=0.$$

Then, the quotient space $([a,b]/\sim_e\, ,\, d_e)$ is a real tree. Intuitively, the local minima of the excursion e are the parents of the local maxima. Another visual way to construct the real tree from an excursion is to "put glue" under the curve of e, and "bend" this curve, identifying the glued points (see animation).

== Examples ==
Real trees often appear, in various situations, as limits of more classical metric spaces.

=== Brownian trees ===
A Brownian tree is a random metric space whose value is a (non-simplicial) real tree almost surely. Brownian trees arise as limits of various random processes on finite trees.

=== Ultralimits of metric spaces ===
Any ultralimit of a sequence $(X_i)$ of $\delta_i$-hyperbolic spaces with $\delta_i \to 0$ is a real tree. In particular, the asymptotic cone of any hyperbolic space is a real tree.

=== Limit of group actions ===
Let $G$ be a group. For a sequence of based $G$-spaces $(X_i, *_i, \rho_i)$ there is a notion of convergence to a based $G$-space $(X_\infty, x_\infty, \rho_\infty)$ due to M. Bestvina and F. Paulin. When the spaces are hyperbolic and the actions are unbounded the limit (if it exists) is a real tree.

A simple example is obtained by taking $G = \pi_1(S)$ where $S$ is a compact surface, and $X_i$ the universal cover of $S$ with the metric $i\rho$ (where $\rho$ is a fixed hyperbolic metric on $S$).

This is useful to produce actions of hyperbolic groups on real trees. Such actions are analyzed using the so-called Rips machine. A case of particular interest is the study of degeneration of groups acting properly discontinuously on a real hyperbolic space (this predates Rips', Bestvina's and Paulin's work and is due to J. Morgan and P. Shalen).

=== Algebraic groups ===
If $F$ is a field with an ultrametric valuation then the Bruhat–Tits building of $\mathrm{SL}_2(F)$ is a real tree. It is simplicial if and only if the valuations is discrete.

== Generalisations ==
=== Λ-trees ===
If $\Lambda$ is a totally ordered abelian group there is a natural notion of a distance with values in $\Lambda$ (classical metric spaces correspond to $\Lambda = \mathbb R$). There is a notion of $\Lambda$-tree which recovers simplicial trees when $\Lambda = \mathbb Z$ and real trees when $\Lambda = \mathbb R$. The structure of finitely presented groups acting freely on $\Lambda$-trees was described. In particular, such a group acts freely on some $\mathbb R^n$-tree.

=== Real buildings ===
The axioms for a building can be generalized to give a definition of a real building. These arise for example as asymptotic cones of higher-rank symmetric spaces or as Bruhat-Tits buildings of higher-rank groups over valued fields.

== See also ==
- Dendroid (topology)
- Tree-graded space
