= The Bible Code (book) =

1997 book by Michael Drosnin

- Author: Michael Drosnin
- Publisher: Simon & Schuster
- Publication date: 1997

The Bible Code is a book by Michael Drosnin, first published by Simon & Schuster in 1997. A sequel, Bible Code II: The Countdown, was published by Penguin Random House in 2002, and also reached New York Times Best-Seller status. In 2010, Bible Code III: Saving the World was published by Worldmedia, Inc., completing a trilogy.

== The Bible Code and its interpretation of Bible Code theory ==
Drosnin describes an alleged "Bible code", in which messages are encoded in the Hebrew Bible. The messages are purported to be hidden in the Torah, and can be deciphered by placing the letters of various Torah passages at equal intervals in a text that has been formatted to fit inside a graph.

Drosnin suggests that the code was written by extraterrestrial life (which he claims also brought the DNA of the human genetic code to Earth). Drosnin elaborates on this theory in Bible Code II: The Countdown, suggesting that the alien who brought the code left the key to the code in a steel obelisk. Drosnin attempted to find this obelisk, which he believes is buried near the Dead Sea.

Drosnin's book claims to be based on the technique described in the 1994 paper "Equidistant Letter Sequences in the Book of Genesis" by Eliyahu Rips, Doron Witztum, and Yoav Rosenberg, who have all denounced the conclusions drawn in The Bible Code.

== Criticism ==
The general construction of alleged "Bible codes" and Drosnin's methodology in particular have been criticised by mathematicians and others.

== Acquisition of The Bible Code by Warner Bros. Pictures and "Code" screenplay ==
In May 1997, Warner Bros. Pictures acquired the film rights to The Bible Code. At the time of acquisition, "[t]he studio's production presidents, Lorenzo di Bonaventura and Bill Gerber, said that the work 'addresses the age-old questions of our purpose on Earth, the meaning of the Bible, and our uniqueness in the universe – all issues that have stimulated the imagination for thousands of years'."

Drosnin, collaborating with filmmaker and writer Ruth Rachel Anderson-Avraham (née Yvonne Michele Anderson), an English Language and Literature and Religious Studies major from the University of Virginia who had then taken time off from her interdisciplinary graduate studies, including quantitative work and the pursuit of graduate degrees at HEC Paris and Harvard Law School, completed a screenplay entitled "Code" for Warner Bros. Pictures in 1998."Written after the terrorist bombing of the World Trade Center on February 26, 1993, but prior to September 11, 2001, the screenplay includes a plot line recalling the 1993 Al Qaeda attack on the Twin Towers, at a time when the tragic events of 9/11 were 'unimagineable'."The action of the story was set in New York City and Jerusalem.

Notwithstanding, this screenplay was never greenlit by Warner Bros. Pictures, and the rights eventually reverted to the author.

In 2010, Relativity Media purchased the film rights to The Bible Code series, then a trilogy including The Bible Code, Bible Code II: The Countdown, and Bible Code III: Saving the World. Relativity Media had hoped to produce a Bible Code film for release in 2012, but this project never came to fruition.

== Bibliography ==
- The Bible Code. (US, Simon & Schuster, 1997, ISBN 0-684-81079-4); (UK, Weidenfeld & Nicolson, 1997, ISBN 0-297-81995-X)
- The Bible Code II: The Countdown. (US, Viking Books, 2002, ISBN 0-670-03210-7); (UK, Weidenfeld & Nicolson, 2002, ISBN 0-297-84249-8)
- The Bible Code III: The Quest. (UK, Weidenfeld & Nicolson, 2010, ISBN 0-297-84784-8)
- The Bible Code III: Saving the World. Worldmedia. 2010. ISBN 978-0-615-39963-8.

== Related literature ==
- Jeffrey Satinover: "Cracking the Bible Code". Wm Morrow, 1997. ISBN 0-688-15463-8. Appeared slightly later, follows a more historical and traditional route.
