= Gromov product =

In mathematics, the Gromov product is a concept in the theory of metric spaces named after the mathematician Mikhail Gromov. The Gromov product can also be used to define δ-hyperbolic metric spaces in the sense of Gromov.

== Definition ==
Let (X, d) be a metric space and let x, y, z ∈ X. Then the Gromov product of y and z at x, denoted (y, z)_{x}, is defined by

$$(y, z)_{x} = \frac1{2} \big( d(x, y) + d(x, z) - d(y, z) \big).$$

== Motivation ==

Given three points x, y, z in the metric space X, by the triangle inequality there exist non-negative numbers a, b, c such that $d(x,y) = a + b, \ d(x,z) = a + c, \ d(y,z) = b + c$. Then the Gromov products are $(y,z)_x = a, \ (x,z)_y = b, \ (x,y)_z = c$. In the case that the points x, y, z are the outer nodes of a tripod then these Gromov products are the lengths of the edges.

In the hyperbolic, spherical or euclidean plane, the Gromov product (A, B)_{C} equals the distance p between C and the point where the incircle of the geodesic triangle ABC touches the edge CB or CA. Indeed from the diagram c = (a – p) + (b – p), so that p = (a + b – c)/2 = (A,B)_{C}. Thus for any metric space, a geometric interpretation of (A, B)_{C} is obtained by isometrically embedding (A, B, C) into the euclidean plane.

== Properties ==
- The Gromov product is symmetric: (y, z)_{x} = (z, y)_{x}.
- The Gromov product degenerates at the endpoints: (y, z)_{y} = (y, z)_{z} = 0.
- For any points p, q, x, y and z,

$$d(x, y) = (x, z)_{y} + (y, z)_{x},$$
$$0 \leq (y, z)_{x} \leq \min \big\{ d(y, x), d(z, x) \big\},$$
$$\big| (y, z)_{p} - (y, z)_{q} \big| \leq d(p, q),$$
$$\big| (x, y)_{p} - (x, z)_{p} \big| \leq d(y, z).$$

== Points at infinity ==
Consider hyperbolic space H^{n}. Fix a base point p and let $x_\infty$ and $y_\infty$ be two distinct points at infinity. Then the limit

$$\liminf_{x \to x_\infty \atop y \to y_\infty} (x,y)_p$$

exists and is finite, and therefore can be considered as a generalized Gromov product. It is actually given by the formula

$$(x_\infty, y_\infty)_{p} = \log \csc (\theta/2),$$

where $\theta$ is the angle between the geodesic rays $px_\infty$ and $py_\infty$.

== δ-hyperbolic spaces and divergence of geodesics ==
The Gromov product can be used to define δ-hyperbolic spaces in the sense of Gromov.: (X, d) is said to be δ-hyperbolic if, for all p, x, y and z in X,

$$(x, z)_{p} \geq \min \big\{ (x, y)_{p}, (y, z)_{p} \big\} - \delta.$$

In this case. Gromov product measures how long geodesics remain close together. Namely, if x, y and z are three points of a δ-hyperbolic metric space then the initial segments of length (y, z)_{x} of geodesics from x to y and x to z are no further than 2δ apart (in the sense of the Hausdorff distance between closed sets).
