= Ultralimit =

Concept in mathematics

In mathematics, an ultralimit is a geometric construction that assigns a limit metric space to a sequence of metric spaces $X_n$. The concept captures the limiting behavior of finite configurations in the $X_n$ spaces employing an ultrafilter to bypass the need for repeated consideration of subsequences to ensure convergence. Ultralimits generalize Gromov–Hausdorff convergence in metric spaces.

== Ultrafilters ==
An ultrafilter, denoted as ω, on the set of natural numbers $\mathbb{N}$ is a set of nonempty subsets of $\mathbb{N}$ (whose indicator function can be thought of as a measure) which is closed under finite intersection, upwards-closed, and also which, given any subset X of $\mathbb{N}$, contains either X or $\mathbb{N} \setminus X.$ An ultrafilter on $\mathbb{N}$ is non-principal if it contains no finite set.

== Limit of a sequence of points with respect to an ultrafilter ==
In the following, ω is a non-principal ultrafilter on $\mathbb N$.

If $(x_n)_{n\in \mathbb N}$ is a sequence of points in a metric space (X,d) and x∈ X, then the point x is called an ω-limit of x_{n}, denoted as $x=\lim_\omega x_n$, if for every $\epsilon>0$ it holds that

$$\{n: d(x_n,x)\le \epsilon \}\in\omega.$$

It is observed that,

- If an ω-limit of a sequence of points exists, it is unique.
- If $x=\lim_{n\to\infty} x_n$ in the standard sense, $x=\lim_\omega x_n$. (For this property to hold, it is crucial that the ultrafilter should be non-principal.)

A fundamental fact states that, if (X,d) is compact and ω is a non-principal ultrafilter on $\mathbb N$, the ω-limit of any sequence of points in X exists (and is necessarily unique). In particular, any bounded sequence of real numbers has a well-defined ω-limit in $\mathbb R$, as closed intervals are compact.

== Ultralimit of metric spaces with specified base-points ==
Let ω be a non-principal ultrafilter on $\mathbb N$. Let (X_{n} ,d_{n}) be a sequence of metric spaces with specified base-points p_{n} ∈ X_{n}.

A sequence $(x_n)_{n\in\mathbb N}$, where x_{n} ∈ X_{n}, is admissible if the sequence of real numbers (d_{n}(x_{n} ,p_{n}))_{n} is bounded, that is, if there exists a positive real number C such that $d_n(x_n,p_n)\le C$ for all n. Denote the set of all admissible sequences by $\mathcal A$.

It follows from the triangle inequality that for any two admissible sequences $\mathbf x=(x_n)_{n\in\mathbb N}$ and $\mathbf y=(y_n)_{n\in\mathbb N}$ the sequence (d_{n}(x_{n},y_{n}))_{n} is bounded and hence there exists an ω-limit $\hat d_\infty(\mathbf x, \mathbf y):=\lim_\omega d_n(x_n,y_n)$. We define an equivalence relation $\sim$ on the set $\mathcal A$ of all admissible sequences as follows: for $\mathbf x, \mathbf y\in \mathcal A$, one has $\mathbf x\sim\mathbf y$ iff $\hat d_\infty(\mathbf x, \mathbf y)=0.$

The ultralimit $\lim_\omega(X_n,d_n, p_n)$ with respect to ω of the sequence (X_{n},d_{n}, p_{n}) is a metric space $(X_\infty, d_\infty)$ defined as follows.

As a set, we take $X_\infty=\mathcal A/{\sim}$ .

For two $\sim$-equivalence classes $[\mathbf x], [\mathbf y]$ of admissible sequences $\mathbf x=(x_n)_{n\in\mathbb N}$ and $\mathbf y=(y_n)_{n\in\mathbb N}$, we define $d_\infty([\mathbf x], [\mathbf y]):=\hat d_\infty(\mathbf x,\mathbf y)=\lim_\omega d_n(x_n,y_n).$ This definition is independent of the choice of representative elements. Then $d_\infty$ is a metric on $X_\infty$.

== On base points in the case of uniformly bounded spaces ==
Suppose that (X_{n}, d_{n}) is a sequence of metric spaces of uniformly bounded diameter, that is, there exists a real number C > 0 such that diam(X_{n}) ≤ C for every $n\in \mathbb N$. Then for any choice p_{n} of base-points in X_{n} every sequence $(x_n)_n, x_n\in X_n$ is admissible. Therefore, in this situation the choice of base-points does not have to be specified when defining an ultralimit, and the ultralimit $(X_\infty, d_\infty)$ depends only on (X_{n}, d_{n}) and on ω but does not depend on the choice of a base-point sequence $p_n\in X_n$. In this case one writes $(X_\infty, d_\infty)=\lim_\omega(X_n,d_n)$.

== Basic properties of ultralimits ==
1. If (X_{n},d_{n}) are geodesic metric spaces then $(X_\infty, d_\infty)=\lim_\omega(X_n, d_n, p_n)$ is also a geodesic metric space.
2. If (X_{n},d_{n}) are complete metric spaces then $(X_\infty, d_\infty)=\lim_\omega(X_n,d_n, p_n)$ is also a complete metric space.

Actually, by construction, the limit space is always complete, even when (X_{n}, d_{n}) is a repeating sequence of a space (X, d) which is not complete.

1. If (X_{n}, d_{n}) are compact metric spaces that converge to a compact metric space (X, d) in the Gromov–Hausdorff sense (this automatically implies that the spaces (X_{n}, d_{n}) have uniformly bounded diameter), then the ultralimit $(X_\infty, d_\infty)=\lim_\omega(X_n,d_n)$ is isometric to (X, d).
2. Suppose that (X_{n}, d_{n}) are proper metric spaces and that $p_n\in X_n$ are base-points such that the pointed sequence (X_{n}, d_{n}, p_{n}) converges to a proper metric space (X, d) in the Gromov–Hausdorff sense. Then the ultralimit $(X_\infty, d_\infty)=\lim_\omega(X_n,d_n,p_n)$ is isometric to (X, d).
3. Let κ ≤ 0 and let (X_{n}, d_{n}) be a sequence of CAT(κ)-metric spaces. Then the ultralimit $(X_\infty, d_\infty)=\lim_\omega(X_n,d_n, p_n)$ is also a CAT(κ)-space.
4. Let (X_{n}, d_{n}) be a sequence of CAT(κ_{n})-metric spaces where $\lim_{n\to\infty}\kappa_n=-\infty.$ Then the ultralimit $(X_\infty, d_\infty)=\lim_\omega(X_n,d_n, p_n)$ is real tree.

== Asymptotic cones ==
An important class of ultralimits are the so-called asymptotic cones of metric spaces. Let (X,d) be a metric space, let ω be a non-principal ultrafilter on $\mathbb N$ and let p_{n} ∈ X be a sequence of base-points. Then the ω–ultralimit of the sequence $(X, \frac{d}{n}, p_n)$ is called the asymptotic cone of X with respect to ω and $(p_n)_n\,$ and is denoted $Cone_\omega(X,d, (p_n)_n)\,$. One often takes the base-point sequence to be constant, p_{n} = p for some p ∈ X; in this case the asymptotic cone does not depend on the choice of p ∈ X and is denoted by $Cone_\omega(X,d)\,$ or just $Cone_\omega(X)\,$.

The notion of an asymptotic cone plays an important role in geometric group theory since asymptotic cones (or, more precisely, their topological types and bi-Lipschitz types) provide quasi-isometry invariants of metric spaces in general and of finitely generated groups in particular. Asymptotic cones also turn out to be a useful tool in the study of relatively hyperbolic groups and their generalizations.

== Examples ==
1. Let (X,d) be a compact metric space and put (X_{n},d_{n})=(X,d) for every $n\in \mathbb N$. Then the ultralimit $(X_\infty, d_\infty)=\lim_\omega(X_n,d_n)$ is isometric to (X,d).
2. Let (X,d_{X}) and (Y,d_{Y}) be two distinct compact metric spaces and let (X_{n},d_{n}) be a sequence of metric spaces such that for each n either (X_{n},d_{n})=(X,d_{X}) or (X_{n},d_{n})=(Y,d_{Y}). Let $A_1=\{n | (X_n,d_n)=(X,d_X)\}\,$ and $A_2=\{n | (X_n,d_n)=(Y,d_Y)\}\,$. Thus A_{1}, A_{2} are disjoint and $A_1\cup A_2=\mathbb N.$ Therefore, one of A_{1}, A_{2} has ω-measure 1 and the other has ω-measure 0. Hence $\lim_\omega(X_n,d_n)$ is isometric to (X,d_{X}) if ω(A_{1})=1 and $\lim_\omega(X_n,d_n)$ is isometric to (Y,d_{Y}) if ω(A_{2})=1. This shows that the ultralimit can depend on the choice of an ultrafilter ω.
3. Let (M,g) be a compact connected Riemannian manifold of dimension m, where g is a Riemannian metric on M. Let d be the metric on M corresponding to g, so that (M,d) is a geodesic metric space. Choose a base point p∈M. Then the ultralimit (and even the ordinary Gromov-Hausdorff limit) $\lim_\omega(M,n d, p)$ is isometric to the tangent space T_{p}M of M at p with the distance function on T_{p}M given by the inner product g(p). Therefore, the ultralimit $\lim_\omega(M,n d, p)$ is isometric to the Euclidean space $\mathbb R^m$ with the standard Euclidean metric.
4. Let $(\mathbb R^m, d)$ be the standard m-dimensional Euclidean space with the standard Euclidean metric. Then the asymptotic cone $Cone_\omega(\mathbb R^m, d)$ is isometric to $(\mathbb R^m, d)$.
5. Let $(\mathbb Z^2,d)$ be the 2-dimensional integer lattice where the distance between two lattice points is given by the length of the shortest edge-path between them in the grid. Then the asymptotic cone $Cone_\omega(\mathbb Z^2, d)$ is isometric to $(\mathbb R^2, d_1)$ where $d_1\,$ is the Taxicab metric (or L^{1}-metric) on $\mathbb R^2$.
6. Let (X,d) be a δ-hyperbolic geodesic metric space for some δ≥0. Then the asymptotic cone $Cone_\omega(X)\,$ is a real tree.
7. Let (X,d) be a metric space of finite diameter. Then the asymptotic cone $Cone_\omega(X)\,$ is a single point.
8. Let (X,d) be a CAT(0)-metric space. Then the asymptotic cone $Cone_\omega(X)\,$ is also a CAT(0)-space.

== See also ==
- Geometric group theory
