= Eliyahu Rips =

Israeli mathematician of Latvian origin (1948–2024)

- אליהו ריפס
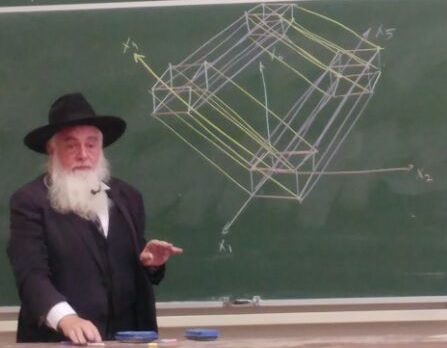
- Rips in 2017
- Born: 12 December 1948; Riga, Latvian SSR, USSR
- Died: 19 July 2024 (aged 75); Jerusalem
- Education: University of Latvia; Hebrew University
- Known for: Rips construction Rips machine Vietoris–Rips complex Torah Code
- Awards: Erdős Prize (1979)
- Scientific career
- Fields: Mathematics
- Workplaces: Hebrew University
- Doctoral advisor: Shimshon Amitsur
- Doctoral students: Zlil Sela

Eliyahu Rips (Hebrew: אליהו ריפס; Russian: Илья Рипс; Latvian: Iļja Ripss; 12 December 1948 – 19 July 2024) was an Israeli mathematician of Latvian Jewish origin, and a former Prisoner of Zion, known for his research in geometric group theory. He became known to the general public following his co-authoring a paper on what is popularly known as Bible code, the supposed coded messaging in the Hebrew text of the Torah.

== Biography ==
Ilya (Eliyahu) Rips grew up in Latvia (then part of the Soviet Union). His mother was Jewish and from Riga, the only of nine siblings that survived the war; the others were killed in Rumbula and other places. His father Aaron was a Jewish mathematician from Belarus; his first wife, children, and all of his relatives were killed in the Holocaust.

Rips was the first high school student from Latvia to participate in the International Mathematical Olympiad. In January 1969, he learnt from listening to Western radio broadcast — then illegal in the USSR — of the self-immolation of Czechoslovak student Jan Palach. On 13 April 1969, Rips, then a graduate student at the University of Latvia, attempted self-immolation in a protest against the Soviet invasion of Czechoslovakia. After unwrapping a self-made slogan condemning the occupation of Czechoslovakia he lit a candle and set his gasoline-soaked clothes ablaze. A group of bystanders was able to quickly put the fire out, resulting only in burns to Rips' neck and hands. Though injured, he was first taken to the local KGB office and interrogated. He was incarcerated by the Soviet government for two years. After his story spread among Western mathematical circles and a wave of petitions, Rips was freed in 1971. The following year, he was allowed to immigrate to Israel.

Rips joined the Department of Mathematics at the Hebrew University of Jerusalem, and in 1975 completed his Ph.D. in mathematics there. His topic was the dimensional subgroup problem. He was awarded the Aharon Katzir Prize. In 1979, Rips received the Erdős Prize from the Israel Mathematical Society, and was a sectional speaker at the International Congress of Mathematicians in 1994.

Rips died on 19 July 2024, at the age of 75. He was survived by his wife, Dvorah, five children, and more than thirty grandchildren.

== Academic career ==
Rips was a professor in the Department of Mathematics at Hebrew University. He was a specialist in geometric group theory. He published work on the Burnside problem, small cancellation rings, double cosets in hyperbolic groups, properties of free groups, torsion-free groups, and many other mathematics topics.

Rips formulated what came to be known as the Rips machine in unpublished work in the early 1990s. The technique provides a way of understanding group actions on $\mathbb R$-trees. Rips collaborated with his student Zlil Sela in work on hyperbolic groups.

== The Bible Code controversy ==
In the late 1970s, Rips began looking with the help of a computer for codes in the Torah. In 1994, Rips, together with Doron Witztum and Yoav Rosenberg, published in the journal Statistical Science an article, "Equidistant Letter Sequences in the Book of Genesis", which claimed the discovery of encoded messages in the Hebrew text of the Book of Genesis. This, in turn, was the inspiration for the 1997 book The Bible Code by journalist Michael Drosnin. While Rips originally claimed that he agreed with Drosnin's findings, in 1997 Rips described Drosnin's book as "on very shaky ground" and "of no value." Since Drosnin's book, Bible codes have been a subject of controversy, with the claims being criticized by Brendan McKay and others. An early supporter of Rips' theories was Robert Aumann, Nobel Prize Laureate in Economics 2005, who headed a commission overseeing Rips' experiments attempting to prove the existence of a secret code from God in the Torah. Eventually, Aumann abandoned the idea and withdrew his support from Rips.

The Bible Code treats the text of the Bible as a word search puzzle: for example, a word may be spelled diagonally moving in a north west direction, or perhaps left-to-right taking every second letter. The more patterns that are allowed, the more words that can be found. Elementary statistics can be used to estimate the probabilities of finding certain hidden messages. The statistician Jeffrey S. Rosenthal shows in his book Struck by Lightning: The Curious World of Probabilities that "hidden messages" are statistically expected and hence should not be seen as divine messages, much less as predictions of the future. Mathematician Brendan McKay illustrated this point by finding messages in the English text of Moby Dick that supposedly "predicted" famous assassinations of the past, such as the assassination of John F. Kennedy and the assassination of Indira Gandhi.

The 1997 "Ig Nobel Prize for Literature" was awarded to Eliyahu Rips, Doron Witztum, Yoav Rosenberg, and Michael Drosnin, for their work on Bible codes.

== Selected papers ==
- Rips, E. "Group actions on R-trees". Preprint.
- Rips, E. (1982). "Subgroups of small cancellation groups". Bulletin of the London Mathematical Society. 14 (1): 45–47. doi:10.1112/blms/14.1.45.
- Rips, E.; Sela, Z. (1994). "Structure and rigidity in hyperbolic groups. I". Geom. Funct. Anal. 4 (3): 337–371. doi:10.1007/bf01896245. S2CID 119386239.
- Rips, E.; Sela, Z. (1995). "Canonical representatives and equations in hyperbolic groups". Invent. Math. 120 (3): 489–512. Bibcode:1995InMat.120..489R. doi:10.1007/bf01241140. S2CID 121404710.
- Rips, E.; Sela, Z. (1997). "Cyclic splittings of finitely presented groups and the canonical JSJ decomposition". Annals of Mathematics. 2. 146 (1): 53–109. doi:10.2307/2951832. JSTOR 2951832.
- Sapir, Mark V.; Birget, Jean-Camille; Rips, Eliyahu (2002). "Isoperimetric and isodiametric functions of groups". Annals of Mathematics. 2. 156 (2): 345–466. arXiv:math/9811105. doi:10.2307/3597195. JSTOR 3597195. S2CID 119728458.
- Birget, J.-C.; Ol'shanskii, A. Yu.; Rips, E.; Sapir, M. V. (2002). "Isoperimetric functions of groups and computational complexity of the word problem". Annals of Mathematics. 2. 156 (2): 467–518. arXiv:math/9811106. doi:10.2307/3597196. JSTOR 3597196. S2CID 14155715.

== See also ==
- List of Ig Nobel Prize winners
