= Michael Drosnin =

American journalist and author (1946–2020)

Michael Alan Drosnin (January 31, 1946 – June 9, 2020) was an American journalist and author, best known for his writings on the Bible code, which is a purported set of secret messages encoded within the Hebrew text of the Torah.

Drosnin was born in New York City. After graduating from Columbia University in 1966, he worked as a journalist for The Washington Post (1966–1968) and The Wall Street Journal (1969–1970).

== Citizen Hughes ==
Michael Drosnin's first book, Citizen Hughes: In His Own Words – How Howard Hughes Tried to Buy America, a biography of the American businessman Howard Hughes based on documents which had been stolen in 1974 and subsequently tracked down by Drosnin, was published in 1985.

== The Bible Code Series ==
Drosnin began researching the Bible Code in 1992 after meeting the mathematician Eliyahu Rips in Israel. His work was deeply inspired by the publication of the academic article entitled "Equidistant Letter Sequences in the Book of Genesis" by Doron Witztum, Eliyahu Rips, and Yoav Rosenberg in the journal Statistical Science, published by the Institute of Mathematical Statistics, in August 1994.

In 1997, Simon & Schuster published Drosnin's The Bible Code, the culmination of his research, which asserts that the Bible Code predicts the future and that events can be affected by our actions. The book also states that many famous assassinations – both past and future – were foretold in the Bible, and that the code can be interpreted with the help of a computer program. The book further claims that the code contains predictions of disasters and an apocalypse to occur between 1998 and 2006.

Drosnin later wrote a second book about the Bible Code entitled Bible Code II:The Countdown, published by Penguin Random House in 2003.

His most recent book Bible Code III: Saving the World, published by Worldmedia, Inc. in October 2010, completes a trilogy.

=== Criticisms ===
Drosnin has been criticized by some who believe that the Bible Code is real but that it cannot predict the future. Some accuse him of factual errors, incorrectly claiming that he has much support in the scientific community, mistranslating Hebrew words to make his point more convincing, and using the Bible without proving that other books do not have similar codes.

In an interview with CNN Interactive, among others, Drosnin challenged his critics to find a code similar to the Bible Code in the notable novel Moby-Dick. An article from the Dartmouth College Mathematics Department described how Brendan McKay was able to find equidistant letter sequences in Moby Dick which could be read as a prediction of the assassination of Yitzhak Rabin. Drosnin described this research as "nonsense", saying that the codes found in the Bible Code were "truth" and contained real predictions.

== Acquisition of The Bible Code by Warner Bros. Pictures and "Code" Screenplay ==
In May 1997, Warner Bros. Pictures acquired the film rights to The Bible Code. At the time of acquisition, "[t]he studio’s production presidents, Lorenzo di Bonaventura and Bill Gerber, said that the work 'addresses the age-old questions of our purpose on Earth, the meaning of the Bible, and our uniqueness in the universe – all issues that have stimulated the imagination for thousands of years'.”

Drosnin, collaborating with filmmaker and writer Ruth Rachel Anderson-Avraham (née Yvonne Michele Anderson), an English Language and Literature and Religious Studies major from the University of Virginia who had then taken time off from her interdisciplinary graduate studies, including quantitative work and the pursuit of graduate degrees at HEC Paris and Harvard Law School, completed a screenplay entitled "Code" for Warner Bros. Pictures in 1998."Written after the terrorist bombing of the World Trade Center on February 26, 1993, but prior to September 11, 2001, the screenplay includes a plot line recalling the 1993 Al Qaeda attack on the Twin Towers, at a time when the tragic events of 9/11 were 'unimagineable'." The action of the story was set in New York City and Jerusalem.

Notwithstanding, this screenplay was never greenlit by Warner Bros. Pictures, and the rights eventually reverted to the author.

In 2010, Relativity Media purchased the film rights to The Bible Code series, then a trilogy including The Bible Code, Bible Code II: The Countdown, and Bible Code III: Saving the World. Relativity Media had hoped to produce a Bible Code film for release in 2012, but this project never came to fruition.

== Death ==
Drosnin died June 9, 2020, aged 74.

== Bibliography ==
- Citizen Hughes: In His Own Words – How Howard Hughes Tried to Buy America (1985, First Edition)
- The Bible Code (1997, First Edition; 1998, First Touchstone Edition)
- Bible Code II: The Countdown (2003)
- Bible Code III: Saving the World (2010)

== Screenplays ==
- "Code" on IMDb (1998, rights reverted)
