= Geodesic metric space =

In mathematics, a geodesic metric space, or a geodesic space, is a concept in metric geometry and metric space theory that formalizes the idea of a space in which any two points can be joined by a shortest path lying entirely in the space. Geodesic metric spaces generalize the notion of straight line segments in Euclidean space and geodesics on a Riemannian manifold to arbitrary metric spaces, without requiring smooth or linear structure.

The existence of geodesics provides additional structure not present in arbitrary metric spaces. In particular, it gives rise to a natural notion of metric convexity. This generalizes convexity in Euclidean geometry and plays a central role in the study of spaces with curvature bounds, such as CAT(k) spaces and Alexandrov spaces. In such settings, properties like uniqueness of geodesics and convexity of distance functions are closely related to notions of sectional curvature and nonpositive curvature.

Important examples of geodesic metric spaces include complete Riemannian manifolds with their intrinsic distance, length spaces (also known as inner metric spaces), and graphs equipped with the intrinsic metric. Geodesic spaces are fundamental in areas such as geometric group theory, where large-scale geometric properties of groups are studied via their actions on geodesic metric spaces, and in the theory of Gromov hyperbolic spaces.

== Definition ==
Formally, a metric space $(X, d)$ is called geodesic if for every pair of points $x, y\in X$ there exists a map $c\colon [0,l]\to X$, called a geodesic path, where $l = d(x, y)$, such that $c(0)=x, c(l)=y$, and $d(c(s),c(t)) = |s-t|$ for all $s,t\in [0,l]$. Equivalently, $c$ is an isometric embedding of a real interval whose length equals the distance between $x$ and $y$.

A geodesic segment joining $x$ and $y$ is the subset of $X$ given by $c([0, l]).$

== Convexity ==
A subset $A\subseteq X$ is called (geodesically) convex if every geodesic segment joining two points of $A$ is entirely contained in $A$.
