= Busemann function =

In geometric topology, Busemann functions are used to study the large-scale geometry of geodesics in Hadamard spaces and in particular Hadamard manifolds (simply connected complete Riemannian manifolds of nonpositive curvature). They are named after Herbert Busemann, who introduced them; he gave an extensive treatment of the topic in his 1955 book "The geometry of geodesics".

== Definition and elementary properties ==
Let $(X,d)$ be a metric space. A geodesic ray is a path $\gamma : [0,\infty) \to X$ which minimizes distance everywhere along its length. i.e., for all $t,t' \in [0,\infty)$,
$$d\big(\gamma(t), \gamma(t') \big) = \big| t - t' \big|.$$
Equivalently, a ray is an isometry from the "canonical ray" (the set $[0,\infty)$ equipped with the Euclidean metric) into the metric space X.

Given a ray γ, the Busemann function $B_\gamma : X \to \mathbb R$ is defined by

$$B_\gamma(x)=\lim_{t\to\infty}\big(d\big( \gamma(t), x \big)  - t \big)$$

Thus, when t is very large, the distance $d\big( \gamma(t), x \big)$ is approximately equal to $B_\gamma(x) + t$. Given a ray γ, its Busemann function is always well-defined: indeed the right hand side above $F_t(x) \stackrel{\text{def}}{=} d\big( \gamma(t), x \big) - t$, tends pointwise to the left hand side on compacta, since $t-d( \gamma(t), x )=d(\gamma(t),\gamma(0)) - d(\gamma(t),x)$ is bounded above by $d(\gamma(0),x)$ and non-decreasing since, if $s\le t$,

$$t-s + d(x,\gamma(s)) - d(x,\gamma(t)) \ge t -s -d (\gamma(s),\gamma(t)) = 0.$$

It is immediate from the triangle inequality that

$$|B_\gamma(x) - B_\gamma(y)|\le d(x,y),$$

so that $B_\gamma$ is uniformly continuous. More specifically, the above estimate above shows that

- Busemann functions are Lipschitz functions with constant 1.

By Dini's theorem, the functions $F_t(x)=d(x,\gamma(t)) -t$ tend to $B_\gamma(x)$ uniformly on compact sets as t tends to infinity.

== Example: Poincaré disk ==
Let $D$ be the unit disk in the complex plane with the Poincaré metric

$$ds^2 = {4 \,|dz|^2 \over (1 - |z|^2)^2}.$$

Then, for $|z| < 1$ and $|\zeta| = 1$, the Busemann function is given by

$$B_\zeta(z) = - \log\left({1 - |z|^2\over |z - \zeta|^2}\right),$$

where the term in brackets on the right hand side is the Poisson kernel for the unit disk and $\zeta$ corresponds to the radial geodesic $\gamma$ from the origin towards $\zeta$, $\gamma(t) = \zeta \tanh(t/2)$. The computation of $d(x,y)$ can be reduced to that of $d(z,0) = d(|z|,0) = 2 \operatorname{artanh}(|z|) = \log \left( \tfrac{1+|z|}{1-|z|} \right)$, since the metric is invariant under Möbius transformations in $SU(1,1)$; the geodesics through $0$ have the form $\zeta g_t(0)$ where $g_t$ is the 1-parameter subgroup of $SU(1,1)$,

$$g_t=\begin{pmatrix}\cosh (t/2) & \sinh (t/2) \\ \sinh (t/2) & \cosh (t/2)\end{pmatrix}$$

The formula above also completely determines the Busemann function by Möbius invariance.

== Busemann functions on a Hadamard space ==
In a Hadamard space, where any two points are joined by a unique geodesic segment, the function $F = F_t$ is convex, i.e. convex on geodesic segments $[x,y]$. Explicitly this means that if $z(s)$ is the point which divides $[x,y]$ in the ratio s : (1 − s), then $F(z(s)) \leq s F(x) + (1 - s) F(y)$. For fixed $a$ the function $d(x,a)$ is convex and hence so are its translates; in particular, if $\gamma$ is a geodesic ray in $X$, then $F_t$ is convex. Since the Busemann function $B_\gamma$ is the pointwise limit of $F_t$,

- Busemann functions are convex on Hadamard spaces.
- On a Hadamard space, the functions $F_t(y)=d(y,\gamma(t)) -t$ converge uniformly to $B_\gamma$ uniformly on any bounded subset of $X$.

Let h(t) = d(y,γ(t)) − t = F_{t}(y). Since $\gamma (t)$ is parametrised by arclength, Alexandrov's first comparison theorem for Hadamard spaces implies that the function g(t) = d(y,γ(t))^{2} − t^{2} is convex. Hence for 0< s < t

$$g(s) \le (1-{s\over t})g(0) + {s\over t} g(t).$$

Thus

$$2sh(s)\le (h(s) +s)^2 - s^2 =g(s)  \le (1-{s\over t})d(x,y)^2 + {s\over t} ( 2th(t) +h(t)^2 )\le d(x,y)^2 + 2s h(t) +{s\over t} d(x,y)^2,$$

so that

$$|F_s(y) - F_t(y)|= |h(s) - h(t)| \le {1\over 2} (s^{-1} + t^{-1}) d(x,y)^2.$$

Letting t tend to ∞, it follows that

$$|F_s(y) - B_\gamma(y)| \le {d(x,y)^2\over 2s},$$

so convergence is uniform on bounded sets.

Note that the inequality above for $|F_s(y) - F_t(y)|$ (together with its proof) also holds for geodesic segments: if γ(t) is a geodesic segment starting at x and parametrised by arclength then

$$|d(y,\Gamma(s)) -s -d(y,\Gamma(t)) +t| \le (s^{-1} + t^{-1}) d(x,y)^2.$$

Next suppose that x, y are points in a Hadamard space, and let δ(s) be the geodesic through x with δ(0) = y and δ(t) = x, where t = d(x,y). This geodesic cuts the boundary of the closed ball B̅(y,r) at the point δ(r). Thus if d(x,y) > r, there is a point v with d(y,v) = r such that d(x,v) = d(x,y) − r.

This condition persists for Busemann functions. The statement and proof of the property for Busemann functions relies on a fundamental theorem on closed convex subsets of a Hadamard space, which generalises orthogonal projection in a Hilbert space: if C is a closed convex set in a Hadamard space X, then every point x in X has a unique closest point P(x) ≡ P_{C}(x) in C and d(P(x),P(y)) ≤ d(x,y); moreover a = P(x) is uniquely determined by the property that, for y in C,

$$d(x,y)^2 \ge d(x,a) ^2 + d(a,y)^2,$$

so that the angle at a in the Euclidean comparison triangle for a,x,y is greater than or equal to π/2.

- If h is a Busemann function on a Hadamard space, then, given y in X and r > 0, there is a unique point v with d(y,v) = r such that h(v) = h(y) − r. For fixed r > 0, the point v is the closest point of y to the closed convex C set of points u such that h(u) ≤ h(y) − r and therefore depends continuously on y.

Let v be the closest point to y in C. Then h(v) = h(y) − r and so h is minimised by v in B̅(y,R) where R = d(y,v) and v is the unique point where h is minimised. By the Lipschitz condition r = |h(y) − h(v)| ≤ R. To prove the assertion, it suffices to show that R = r, i.e. d(y,v) = r. On the other hand, h is the uniform limit on any closed ball of functions h_{n}. On B̅(y,r), these are minimised by points v_{n} with h_{n}(v_{n}) = h_{n}(y) − r. Hence the infimum of h on B̅(y,r) is h(y) − r and h(v_{n}) tends to h(y) − r. Thus h(v_{n}) = h(y) − r_{n} with r_{n} ≤ r and r_{n} tending towards r. Let u_{n} be the closest point to y with h(u_{n}) ≤ h(y) − r_{n}. Let R_{n} = d(y,u_{n}) ≤ r. Then h(u_{n}) = h(y) − r_{n}, and, by the Lipschitz condition on h, R_{n} ≥ r_{n}. In particular R_{n} tends to r. Passing to a subsequence if necessary it can be assumed that r_{n} and R_{n} are both increasing (to r). The inequality for convex optimisation implies that for n > m.

$$d(u_n,u_m)^2 \le R_n^2 - R_m^2\le 2r|R_n -R_m|,$$

so that u_{n} is a Cauchy sequence. If u is its limit, then d(y,u) = r and h(u) = h(y) − r. By uniqueness it follows that u = v and hence d(y,v) = r, as required.

Uniform limits. The above argument proves more generally that if d(x_{n},x_{0}) tends to infinity and the functions h_{n}(x) = d(x,x_{n}) – d(x_{n},x_{0}) tend uniformly on bounded sets to h(x), then h is convex, Lipschitz with Lipschitz constant 1 and, given y in X and r > 0, there is a unique point v with d(y,v) = r such that h(v) = h(y) − r. If on the other hand the sequence (x_{n}) is bounded, then the terms all lie in some closed ball and uniform convergence there implies that (x_{n}) is a Cauchy sequence so converges to some x_{∞} in X. So h_{n} tends uniformly to h_{∞}(x) = d(x,x_{∞}) – d(x_{∞},x_{0}), a function of the same form. The same argument also shows that the class of functions which satisfy the same three conditions (being convex, Lipschitz and having minima on closed balls) is closed under taking uniform limits on bounded sets.

Comment. Note that, since any closed convex subset of a Hadamard subset of a Hadamard space is also a Hadamard space, any closed ball in a Hadamard space is a Hadamard space. In particular it need not be the case that every geodesic segment is contained in a geodesic defined on the whole of R or even a semi-infinite interval [0,∞). The closed unit ball of a Hilbert space gives an explicit example which is not a proper metric space.

- If h is a convex function, Lipschitz with constant 1 and h assumes its minimum on any closed ball centred on y with radius r at a unique point v on the boundary with h(v) = h(y) − r, then for each y in X there is a unique geodesic ray δ such that δ(0) = y and δ cuts each closed convex set h ≤ h(y) – r with r > 0 at δ(r), so that h(δ(t)) = h(y) – t. In particular this holds for each Busemann function.

The third condition implies that v is the closest point to y in the closed convex set C_{r} of points $u$ such that h(u) ≤ h(y) – r. Let δ(t) for 0 ≤ t ≤ r be the geodesic joining y to v. Then k(t) = h(δ(t)) - h(y) is a convex Lipschitz function on [0,r] with Lipschitz constant 1 satisfying k(t) ≤ – t and k(0) = 0 and k(r) = –r. So k vanishes everywhere, since if 0 < s < r, k(s) ≤ –s and |k(s)| ≤ s. Hence h(δ(t)) = h(y) – t. By uniqueness it follows that δ(t) is the closest point to y in C_{t} and that it is the unique point minimising h in B̅(y,t). Uniqueness implies that these geodesics segments coincide for arbitrary r and therefore that δ extends to a geodesic ray with the stated property.

- If h = h_{γ}, then the geodesic ray δ starting at y satisfies $\sup d(\gamma(t),\delta(t)) < \infty$. If δ_{1} is another ray starting at y with $\sup d(\delta(t),\delta_1(t)) < \infty$ then δ_{1} = δ.

To prove the first assertion, it is enough to check this for t sufficiently large. In that case γ(t) and δ(t − h(y)) are the projections of x and y onto the closed convex set h ≤ −t. Therefore, d(γ(t),δ(t − h(y))) ≤ d(x,y). Hence d(γ(t),δ(t)) ≤ d(γ(t),δ(t − h(y))) + d(δ(t − h(y)),δ(t)) ≤ d(x,y) + |h(y)|. The second assertion follows because d(δ_{1}(t),δ(t)) is convex and bounded on [0,∞), so, if it vanishes at t = 0, must vanish everywhere.

- Suppose that h is a continuous convex function and for each y in X there is a unique geodesic ray δ such that δ(0) = y and δ cuts each closed convex set h ≤ h(y) – r with r > 0 at δ(r), so that h(δ(t)) = h(y) – t; then h is a Busemann function. h − h_{δ} is a constant function.

Let C_{r} be the closed convex set of points z with h(z) ≤ −r. Since X is a Hadamard space for every point y in X there is a unique closest point P_{r}(y) to y in C_{r}. It depends continuously on y and if y lies outside C_{r}, then P_{r}(y) lies on the hypersurface h(z) = − r—the boundary ∂C_{r} of C_{r}—and P_{r}(y) satisfies the inequality of convex optimisation. Let δ(s) be the geodesic ray starting at y.

Fix x in X. Let γ(s) be the geodesic ray starting at x. Let g(z) = h_{γ}(z), the Busemann function for γ with base point x. In particular g(x) = 0. It suffices to show that g = h – h(x). Now take y with h(x) = h(y) and let δ(t) be the geodesic ray starting at y corresponding to h. Then

$$d(x,y) \ge d(\gamma(t),\delta(t)),\,\,\, d(x,\delta(t))^2 \ge d(x,\gamma(t))^2+d(\gamma(t),\delta(t))^2,\,\,\,d(y,\gamma(t))^2 \ge d(y,\delta(t))^2+d(\gamma(t),\delta(t))^2.$$

On the other hand, for any four points a, b, c, d in a Hadamard space, the following quadrilateral inequality of Reshetnyak holds:

$$|d(a,c)^2 + d(b,d)^2 - d(a,d)^2 - d(b,c)^2|\le 2 d(a,b)d(c,d).$$

Setting a = x, b = y, c = γ(t), d = δ(t), it follows that

$$|d(y,\gamma(t))^2 - d(x,\gamma(t))^2|\le 2d(x,y)^2,$$

so that

$$|d(y,\gamma(t)) - d(x,\gamma(t))|\le  2 {d(x,y)^2\over d(y,\gamma(t)) + d(x,\gamma(t))}\le {d(x,y)^2\over t}.$$

Hence h_{γ}(y) = 0. Similarly h_{δ}(x) = 0. Hence h_{γ}(y) = 0 on the level surface of h containing x. Now for t ≥ 0 and z in X, let α_{t}(z) = γ_{1}(t) the geodesic ray starting at z. Then α_{s + t} = α_{s} ∘ α_{t} and h ∘ α_{t} = h − t. Moreover, by boundedness, d(α_{t}(u),α_{t}(v)) ≤ d(u,v). The flow α_{s} can be used to transport this result to all the level surfaces of h. For general y_{1}, if h(y_{1}) < h(x), take s > 0 such that h(α_{s}(x)) = h(y_{1}) and set x_{1} = α_{s}(x). Then h_{γ_{1}}(y_{1}) = 0, where γ_{1}(t) = α_{t}(x_{1}) = γ(s + t). But then h_{γ_{1}} = h_{γ} – s, so that h_{γ}(y_{1}) = s. Hence g(y_{1}) = s = h((α_{s}(x)) – h(x) = h(y_{1}) – h(x), as required. Similarly if h(y_{1}) > h(x), take s > 0 such that h(α_{s}(y_{1})) = h(x). Let y = α_{s}(y_{1}). Then h_{γ}(y) = 0, so h_{γ}(y_{1}) = –s. Hence g(y_{1}) = –s = h(y_{1}) – h(x), as required.

Finally there are necessary and sufficient conditions for two geodesics to define the same Busemann function up to constant:

- On a Hadamard space, the Busemann functions of two geodesic rays $\gamma_1$ and $\gamma_2$ differ by a constant if and only if $\sup_{t\ge 0} d(\gamma_1(t),\gamma_2(t)) < \infty$.

Suppose firstly that γ and δ are two geodesic rays with Busemann functions differing by a constant. Shifting the argument of one of the geodesics by a constant, it may be assumed that B_{γ} = B_{δ} = B, say. Let C be the closed convex set on which B(x) ≤ −r. Then B(γ(t)) = B_{γ}(γ(t)) = −t and similarly B(δ(t)) = − t. Then for s ≤ r, the points γ(s) and δ(s) have closest points γ(r) and δ(r) in C, so that d(γ(r), δ(r)) ≤ d(γ(s), δ(s)). Hence sup_{t ≥ 0} d(γ(t), δ(t)) < ∞.

Now suppose that sup_{t ≥ 0} d(γ_{1}(t), γ_{2}(t)) < ∞. Let δ_{i}(t) be the geodesic ray starting at y associated with h_{γ_{i}}. Then sup_{t ≥ 0} d(γ_{i}(t), δ_{i}(t)) < ∞. Hence sup_{t ≥ 0} d(δ_{1}(t), δ_{2}(t)) < ∞. Since δ_{1} and δ_{2} both start at y, it follows that δ_{1}(t) ≡ δ_{2}(t). By the previous result h_{γ_{i}} and h_{δ_{i}} differ by a constant; so h_{γ_{1}} and h_{γ_{2}} differ by a constant.

To summarise, the above results give the following characterisation of Busemann functions on a Hadamard space:

THEOREM. On a Hadamard space, the following conditions on a function f are equivalent:

- h is a Busemann function.
- h is a convex function, Lipschitz with constant 1 and h assumes its minimum on any closed ball centred on y with radius r at a unique point v on the boundary with h(v) = h(y) − r.
- h is a continuous convex function and for each y in X there is a unique geodesic ray δ such that δ(0) = y and, for any r > 0, the ray δ cuts each closed convex set h ≤ h(y) – r at δ(r).

== Bordification of a Hadamard space ==
In the previous section it was shown that if X is a Hadamard space and x_{0} is a fixed point in X then the union of the space of Busemann functions vanishing at x_{0} and the space of functions h_{y}(x) = d(x,y) − d(x_{0},y) is closed under taking uniform limits on bounded sets. This result can be formalised in the notion of bordification of X. In this topology, the points x_{n} tend to a geodesic ray γ starting at x_{0} if and only if d(x_{0},x_{n}) tends to ∞ and for t > 0 arbitrarily large the sequence obtained by taking the point on each segment [x_{0},x_{n}] at a distance t from x_{0} tends to γ(t).

If X is a metric space, Gromov's bordification can be defined as follows. Fix a point x_{0} in X and let X_{N} = B̅(x_{0},N). Let Y = C(X) be the space of Lipschitz continuous functions on X, i.e. those for which | f(x) – f(y) | ≤ A d(x,y) for some constant A > 0. The space Y can be topologised by the seminorms ‖ f ‖_{N} = sup_{X_{N}} | f |, the topology of uniform convergence on bounded sets. The seminorms are finite by the Lipschitz conditions. This is the topology induced by the natural map of C(X) into the direct product of the Banach spaces C_{b}(X_{N}) of continuous bounded functions on X_{N}. It is give by the metric D(f,g) = Σ 2^{−N} ‖ f − g ‖_{N}(1 +‖ f − g ‖_{N})^{−1}.

The space X is embedded into Y by sending x to the function f_{x}(y) = d(y,x) – d(x_{0},x). Let X̅ be the closure of X in Y. Then X̅ is metrisable, since Y is, and contains X as an open subset; moreover bordifications arising from different choices of basepoint are naturally homeomorphic. Let h(x) = (d(x,x_{0}) + 1)^{−1}. Then h lies in C_{0}(X). It is non-zero on X and vanishes only at ∞. Hence it extends to a continuous function on X̅ with zero set X̅ \ X. It follows that X̅ \ X is closed in X̅, as required. To check that X̅ = X̅(x_{0}) is independent of the basepoint, it suffices to show that k(x) = d(x,x_{0}) − d(x,x_{1}) extends to a continuous function on X̅. But k(x) = f_{x}(x_{1}), so, for g in X̅, k(g) = g(x_{1}). Hence the correspondence between the compactifications for x_{0} and x_{1} is given by sending g in X̅(x_{0}) to g + g(x_{1})1 in X̅(x_{1}).

When X is a Hadamard space, Gromov's ideal boundary ∂X = X̅ \ X can be realised explicitly as "asymptotic limits" of geodesic rays using Busemann functions. If x_{n} is an unbounded sequence in X with h_{n}(x) = d(x,x_{n}) − d(x_{n},x_{0}) tending to h in Y, then h vanishes at x_{0}, is convex, Lipschitz with Lipschitz constant 1 and has minimum h(y) − r on any closed ball B̅(y,r). Hence h is a Busemann function B_{γ} corresponding to a unique geodesic ray γ starting at x_{0}.

On the other hand, h_{n} tends to B_{γ} uniformly on bounded sets if and only if d(x_{0},x_{n}) tends to ∞ and for t > 0 arbitrarily large the sequence obtained by taking the point on each segment [x_{0},x_{n}] at a distance t from x_{0} tends to γ(t). For d(x_{0},x_{n}) ≥ t, let x_{n}(t) be the point in [x_{0},x_{n}] with d(x_{0},x_{n}(t)) = t. Suppose first that h_{n} tends to B_{γ} uniformly on B̅(x_{0},R). Then for t ≤ R, |h_{n}(γ(t)) – B_{γ}(γ(t))|=d(γ(t),x_{n}) – d(x_{n},x_{0}) + t. This is a convex function. It vanishes as t = 0 and hence is increasing. So it is maximised at t = R. So for each t, |d(γ(t),x_{n}) – d(x_{n},x_{0}) – t| tends towards 0. Let a = X_{0}, b = γ(t) and c = x_{n}. Then d(c,a) – d(c,b) is close to d(a,b) with d(c,a) large. Hence in the Euclidean comparison triangle CA - CB is close to AB with CA large. So the angle at A is small. So the point D on AC at the same distance as AB lies close to B. Hence, by the first comparison theorem for geodesic triangles, d(x_{n}(t),γ(t)) is small. Conversely suppose that for fixed t and n sufficiently large d(x_{n}(t),γ(t)) tends to 0. Then from the above F_{s}(y) = d(y,γ(s)) – s satisfies

$$|F_s(y) - B_\gamma(y)| \le {d(x_0,y)^2\over 2s},$$

so it suffices show that on any bounded set h_{n}(y) = d(y,x_{n}) – d(x_{0},x_{n}) is uniformly close to F_{s}(y) for n sufficiently large.

For a fixed ball B̅(x_{0},R), fix s so that R^{2}/s ≤ ε. The claim is then an immediate consequence of the inequality for geodesic segments in a Hadamard space, since

$$|d(y,x_n) -d(y,x_0) - d(y,x_n(s)) + s |\le  {d(x_0,y)^2\over s} \le \varepsilon.$$

Hence, if y in B̅(x_{0},R) and n is sufficiently large that d(x_{n}(s),γ(s)) ≤ ε, then

$$|h_n(y)-B_\gamma(y)|=|d(y,x_n) -d(y,x_0) - B_\gamma(y)| \le |d(y,x_n) -d(y,x_0) - d(y,x_n(s)) + s | + d(x_n(s),\gamma(s)) + |F_s(y) - B_\gamma(y)| \le 3\varepsilon.$$

== Busemann functions on a Hadamard manifold ==
Suppose that x, y are points in a Hadamard manifold and let γ(s) be the geodesic through x with γ(0) = y. This geodesic cuts the boundary of the closed ball B̅(y,r) at the two points γ(±r). Thus if d(x,y) > r, there are points u, v with d(y,u) = d(y,v) = r such that | d(x,u) − d(x,v) | = 2r. By continuity this condition persists for Busemann functions:

- If h is a Busemann function on a Hadamard manifold, then, given y in X and r > 0, there are unique points u, v with d(y,u) = d(y,v) = r such that h(u) = h(y) + r and h(v) = h(y) − r. For fixed r > 0, the points u and v depend continuously on y.

Taking a sequence t_{n} tending to ∞ and h_{n} = F_{t_{n}}, there are points u_{n} and v_{n} which satisfy these conditions for h_{n} for n sufficiently large. Passing to a subsequence if necessary, it can be assumed that u_{n} and v_{n} tend to u and v. By continuity these points satisfy the conditions for h. To prove uniqueness, note that by compactness h assumes its maximum and minimum on B̅(y,r). The Lipschitz condition shows that the values of h there differ by at most 2r. Hence h is minimized at v and maximized at u. On the other hand, d(u,v) = 2r and for u and v the points v and u are the unique points in B̅(y,r) maximizing this distance. The Lipschitz condition on h then immediately implies u and v must be the unique points in B̅(y,r) maximizing and minimizing h. Now suppose that y_{n} tends to y. Then the corresponding points u_{n} and v_{n} lie in a closed ball so admit convergent subsequences. But by uniqueness of u and v any such subsequences must tend to u and v, so that u_{n} and v_{n} must tend to u and v, establishing continuity.

The above result holds more generally in a Hadamard space.

- If h is a Busemann function on a Hadamard manifold, then h is continuously differentiable with ‖ dh(y) ‖ = 1 for all y.

From the previous properties of h, for each y there is a unique geodesic γ(t) parametrised by arclength with γ(0) = y such that h ∘ γ(t) = h(y) + t. It has the property that it cuts ∂B(y,r) at t = ±r: in the previous notation γ(r) = u and γ(–r) = v. The vector field V_{h} defined by the unit vector $\dot{\gamma}(0)$ at y is continuous, because u is a continuous function of y and the map sending (x,v) to (x,exp_{x} v) is a diffeomorphism from TX onto X × X by the Cartan-Hadamard theorem. Let δ(s) be another geodesic parametrised by arclength through y with δ(0) = y. Then dh ∘ δ (0)/ ds = $(\dot{\delta}(0),\dot{\gamma}(0))$. Indeed, let H(x) = h(x) − h(y), so that H(y) = 0. Then

$$|H(\delta(s)) - H(x)| \le d(\delta(s),x).$$

Applying this with x = u and v, it follows that for s > 0

$$(r- d(\delta(s),u))/s \le (h(\delta(s)) - h(y))/s \le (d(\delta(s),v) -r)/s.$$

The outer terms tend to $(\dot{\delta}(0),\dot{\gamma}(0))$ as s tends to 0, so the middle term has the same limit, as claimed. A similar argument applies for s < 0.

The assertion on the outer terms follows from the first variation formula for arclength, but can be deduced directly as follows. Let $a=\dot{\delta}(0)$ and $b=\dot{\gamma}(0)$, both unit vectors. Then for tangent vectors p and q at y in the unit ball

$$d(\exp_y p,\exp_y q) = \|p-q\| + \varepsilon \max \|p\|^2, \|q\|^2$$

with ε uniformly bounded. Let s = t^{3} and r = t^{2}. Then

$$(d(\delta(s),v) -r)/s= (d(\exp_y(t^3 a),\exp_y(-t^2 b)) - t^2)/t^3 = (\|t^3a +t^2b\| - t^2)/t^3 + \varepsilon |t|= (\|ta +b\| -1)/t + \varepsilon |t|.$$

The right hand side here tends to (a,b) as t tends to 0 since

$${d\over dt} \|b + t a\||_{t=0 }= {1\over 2} \,{d\over dt} \|b + t a\|^2|_{t=0} = (a,b).$$

The same method works for the other terms.

Hence it follows that h is a C^{1} function with dh dual to the vector field V_{h}, so that ‖ dh(y) ‖ = 1. The vector field V_{h} is thus the gradient vector field for h. The geodesics through any point are the flow lines for the flow α_{t} for V_{h}, so that α_{t} is the gradient flow for h.

THEOREM. On a Hadamard manifold X the following conditions on a continuous function h are equivalent:

1. h is a Busemann function.
2. h is a convex, Lipschitz function with constant 1, and for each y in X there are points u_{±} at a distance r from y such that h(u_{±}) = h(y) ± r.
3. h is a convex C^{1} function with ‖ dh(x) ‖ ≡ 1.

It has already been proved that (1) implies (2).

The arguments above show mutatis mutandi that (2) implies (3).

It therefore remains to show that (3) implies (1). Fix x in X. Let α_{t} be the gradient flow for h. It follows that h ∘ α_{t} (x) = h(x) + t and that γ(t) = α_{t}(x) is a geodesic through x parametrised by arclength with γ(0) = x. Indeed, if s < t, then

$$|s-t|=|h(\alpha_s(x))-h(\alpha_t(x))| \le d(\alpha_s(x),\alpha_t(x))\le \int_{s}^t \|d\alpha_\tau(x)/d\tau\|  \, d\tau =\int_s^t \|dh(\alpha_\tau(x))\| \, d\tau = |s-t|,$$

so that d(γ(s),γ(t)) = | s − t |. Let g(y) = h_{γ}(y), the Busemann function for γ with base point x. In particular g(x) = 0. To prove (1), it suffices to show that g = h – h(x)1.

Let C(−r) be the closed convex set of points z with h(z) ≤ −r. Since X is a Hadamard space for every point y in X there is a unique closest point P_{r}(y) to y in C(-r). It depends continuously on y and if y lies outside C(-r), then P_{r}(y) lies on the hypersurface h(z) = − r—the boundary ∂C(–r) of C(–r)—and the geodesic from y to P_{r}(y) is orthogonal to ∂C(–r). In this case the geodesic is just α_{t}(y). Indeed, the fact that α_{t} is the gradient flow of h and the conditions ‖ dh(y) ‖ ≡ 1 imply that the flow lines α_{t}(y) are geodesics parametrised by arclength and cut the level curves of h orthogonally. Taking y with h(y) = h(x) and t > 0,

$$d(x,y) \ge d(\alpha_t(x),\alpha_t(y)),\,\,\, d(x,\alpha_t(y))^2 \ge d(x,\alpha_t(x))^2+d(\alpha_t(x),\alpha_t(y))^2,\,\,\,d(y,\alpha_t(x))^2 \ge d(y,\alpha_t(y))^2+d(\alpha_t(x),\alpha_t(y))^2.$$

On the other hand, for any four points a, b, c, d in a Hadamard space, the following quadrilateral inequality of Reshetnyak holds:

$$|d(a,c)^2 + d(b,d)^2 - d(a,d)^2 - d(b,d)^2|\le 2 d(a,b)d(c,d).$$

Setting a = x, b = y, c = α_{t}(x), d = α_{t}(y), it follows that

$$|d(y,\alpha_t(x))^2 - d(x,\alpha_t(x))^2|\le 2d(x,y)^2,$$

so that

$$|d(y,\alpha_t(x)) - d(x,\alpha_t(x))|\le  2 {d(x,y)^2\over d(y,\alpha_t(x)) + d(x,\alpha_t(x))}\le {d(x,y)^2\over t}.$$

Hence h_{γ}(y) = 0 on the level surface of h containing x. The flow α_{s} can be used to transport this result to all the level surfaces of h. For general y_{1} take s such that h(α_{s}(x)) = h(y_{1}) and set x_{1} = α_{s}(x). Then h_{γ_{1}}(y_{1}) = 0, where γ_{1}(t) = α_{t}(x_{1}) = γ(s + t). But then h_{γ_{1}} = h_{γ} – s, so that h_{γ}(y_{1}) = s. Hence g(y_{1}) = s = h((α_{s}(x)) – h(x) = h(y_{1}) – h(x), as required.

Note that this argument could be shortened using the fact that two Busemann functions h_{γ} and h_{δ} differ by a constant if and only if the corresponding geodesic rays satisfy sup_{t ≥ 0} d(γ(t),δ(t)) < ∞. Indeed, all the geodesics defined by the flow α_{t} satisfy the latter condition, so differ by constants. Since along any of these geodesics h is linear with derivative 1, h must differ from these Busemann functions by constants.

== Compactification of a proper Hadamard space ==
Eberlein & O'Neill (1973) defined a compactification of a Hadamard manifold X which uses Busemann functions. Their construction, which can be extended more generally to proper (i.e. locally compact) Hadamard spaces, gives an explicit geometric realisation of a compactification defined by Gromov—by adding an "ideal boundary"—for the more general class of proper metric spaces X, those for which every closed ball is compact. Note that, since any Cauchy sequence is contained in a closed ball, any proper metric space is automatically complete. The ideal boundary is a special case of the ideal boundary for a metric space. In the case of Hadamard spaces, this agrees with the space of geodesic rays emanating from any fixed point described using Busemann functions in the bordification of the space.

If X is a proper metric space, Gromov's compactification can be defined as follows. Fix a point x_{0} in X and let X_{N} = B̅(x_{0},N). Let Y = C(X) be the space of Lipschitz continuous functions on X, .e. those for which | f(x) – f(y) | ≤ A d(x,y) for some constant A > 0. The space Y can be topologised by the seminorms ‖ f ‖_{N} = sup_{X_{N}} | f |, the topology of uniform convergence on compacta. This is the topology induced by the natural map of C(X) into the direct product of the Banach spaces C(X_{N}). It is give by the metric D(f,g) = Σ 2^{−N} ‖ f − g ‖ _{N}(1 + ‖ f − g ‖ _{N})^{−1}.

The space X is embedded into Y by sending x to the function f_{x}(y) = d(y,x) – d(x_{0},x). Let X̅ be the closure of X in Y. Then X̅ is compact (metrisable) and contains X as an open subset; moreover compactifications arising from different choices of basepoint are naturally homeomorphic. Compactness follows from the Arzelà–Ascoli theorem since the image in C(X_{N}) is equicontinuous and uniformly bounded in norm by N. Let x_{n} be a sequence in X ⊂ X̅ tending to y in X̅ \ X. Then all but finitely many terms must lie outside X_{N} since X_{N} is compact, so that any subsequence would converge to a point in X_{N}; so the sequence x_{n} must be unbounded in X. Let h(x) = (d(x,x_{0}) + 1)^{−1}. Then h lies in C_{0}(X). It is non-zero on X and vanishes only at ∞. Hence it extends to a continuous function on X̅ with zero set X̅ \ X. It follows that X̅ \ X is closed in X̅, as required. To check that the compactification X̅ = X̅(x_{0}) is independent of the basepoint, it suffices to show that k(x) = d(x,x_{0}) − d(x,x_{1}) extends to a continuous function on X̅. But k(x) = f_{x}(x_{1}), so, for g in X̅, k(g) = g(x_{1}). Hence the correspondence between the compactifications for x_{0} and x_{1} is given by sending g in X̅(x_{0}) to g + g(x_{1})1 in X̅(x_{1}).

When X is a Hadamard manifold (or more generally a proper Hadamard space), Gromov's ideal boundary ∂X = X̅ \ X can be realised explicitly as "asymptotic limits" of geodesics by using Busemann functions. Fixing a base point x_{0}, there is a unique geodesic γ(t) parametrised by arclength such that γ(0) = x_{0} and $\dot{\gamma}(0)$ is a given unit vector. If B_{γ} is the corresponding Busemann function, then B_{γ} lies in ∂X(x_{0}) and induces a homeomorphism of the unit (n − 1)-sphere onto ∂X(x_{0}), sending $\dot{\gamma}(0)$ to B_{γ}.

== Quasigeodesics in the Poincaré disk, CAT(-1) and hyperbolic spaces ==
=== Morse–Mostow lemma ===
In the case of spaces of negative curvature, such as the Poincaré disk, CAT(-1) and hyperbolic spaces, there is a metric structure on their Gromov boundary. This structure is preserved by the group of quasi-isometries which carry geodesics rays to quasigeodesic rays. Quasigeodesics were first studied for negatively curved surfaces—in particular the hyperbolic upper halfplane and unit disk—by Morse and generalised to negatively curved symmetric spaces by Mostow, for his work on the rigidity of discrete groups. The basic result is the Morse–Mostow lemma on the stability of geodesics.

By definition a quasigeodesic Γ defined on an interval [a,b] with −∞ ≤ a < b ≤ ∞ is a map Γ(t) into a metric space, not necessarily continuous, for which there are constants λ ≥ 1 and ε > 0 such that for all s and t:

$$\lambda^{-1} |s-t| - \varepsilon \le d(\Gamma(s),\Gamma(t)) \le \lambda |s-t| + \varepsilon.$$

The following result is essentially due to Marston Morse (1924).

Morse's lemma on stability of geodesics. In the hyperbolic disk there is a constant R depending on λ and ε such that any quasigeodesic segment Γ defined on a finite interval [a,b] is within a Hausdorff distance R of the geodesic segment [Γ(a),Γ(b)].

=== Classical proof for Poincaré disk ===
The classical proof of Morse's lemma for the Poincaré unit disk or upper halfplane proceeds more directly by using orthogonal projection onto the geodesic segment.

- It can be assumed that Γ satisfies the stronger "pseudo-geodesic" condition:

$$\lambda^{-1}|s-t| -\varepsilon \le d(\Gamma(s),\Gamma(t)) \le \lambda |s-t|.$$

Γ can be replaced by a continuous piecewise geodesic curve Δ with the same endpoints lying at a finite Hausdorff distance from Γ less than c = (2λ^{2} + 1)ε: break up the interval on which Γ is defined into equal subintervals of length 2λε and take the geodesics between the images under Γ of the endpoints of the subintervals. Since Δ is piecewise geodesic, Δ is Lipschitz continuous with constant λ_{1}, d(Δ(s),Δ(t)) ≤ λ_{1} | s – t |, where λ_{1} ≤ λ + ε. The lower bound is automatic at the endpoints of intervals. By construction the other values differ from these by a uniformly bounded depending only on λ and ε; the lower bound inequality holds by increasing ε by adding on twice this uniform bound.

- If γ is a piecewise smooth curve segment lying outside an s-neighbourhood of a geodesic line and P is the orthogonal projection onto the geodesic line then:

$$\ell(P \circ \gamma) \le {\ell(\gamma)\over \cosh s}.$$

Applying an isometry in the upper half plane, it may be assumed that the geodesic line is the positive imaginary axis in which case the orthogonal projection onto it is given by P(z) = i | z | and | z | / Im z = cosh d(z,Pz). Hence the hypothesis implies | γ(t) | ≥ cosh(s) Im γ(t), so that

$$\ell(P\circ\gamma) =  \int_a^b {|d\gamma|\over |\gamma|} \le \int_a^b {|d\gamma|\over \cosh(s)\, \Im \gamma}={\ell(\gamma)\over \cosh(s)}.$$

- There is a constant h > 0 depending only on λ and ε such that Γ[a,b] lies within an h-neighbourhood of the geodesic segment [Γ(a),Γ(b)].

Let γ(t) be the geodesic line containing the geodesic segment [Γ(a),Γ(b)]. Then there is a constant h > 0 depending only on λ and ε such that h-neighbourhood Γ[a,b] lies within an h-neighbourhood of γ(R). Indeed, for any s > 0, the subset of [a,b] for which Γ(t) lies outside the closure of the s-neighbourhood of γ(R) is open, so a countable union of open intervals (c,d). Then

$$\ell(\Gamma|_{[c,d]}) \le s_1 \equiv \lambda^2 (2s +\varepsilon) \left(1 -{\lambda^2\over \cosh(s)}\right),$$

since the left hand side is less than or equal to λ | c – d | and

$${|c-d|\over \lambda} -\varepsilon \le d(\Gamma(c),\Gamma(d)) \le 2s + d(P \circ \Gamma|_{[c,d]}) \le 2s + {\lambda |c-d|\over\cosh(s)}.$$

Hence every point lies at a distance less than or equal to s + s_{1} of γ(R). To deduce the assertion, note that the subset of [a,b] for which Γ(t) lies outside the closure of the s-neighbourhood of [Γ(a),Γ(b)] ⊂ γ(R) is open, so a union of intervals (c,d) with Γ(c) and Γ(d) both at a distance s + s_{1} from either Γ(a) or Γ(b). Then

$$\ell(\Gamma|_{[c,d]}) \le s_2 \equiv \lambda^2(2(s + s_1) + \varepsilon),$$

since

$${|c-d|\over \lambda} -\varepsilon \le d(\Gamma(c),\Gamma(d)) \le 2(s+s_1).$$

Hence the assertion follows taking any h greater than s +s_{1} + s_{2}.

- There is a constant h > 0 depending only on λ and ε such that the geodesic segment [Γ(a),Γ(b)] lies within an h-neighbourhood of Γ[a,b].

Every point of Γ[a,b] lies within a distance h of [Γ(a),Γ(b)]. Thus orthogonal projection P carries each point of Γ[a,b] onto a point in the closed convex set [Γ(a),Γ(b)] at a distance less than h. Since P is continuous and Γ[a,b] connected, the map P must be onto since the image contains the endpoints of [Γ(a),Γ(b)]. But then every point of [Γ(a),Γ(b)] is within a distance h of a point of Γ[a,b].

=== Gromov's proof for Poincaré disk ===
The generalisation of Morse's lemma to CAT(-1) spaces is often referred to as the Morse–Mostow lemma and can be proved by a straightforward generalisation of the classical proof. There is also a generalisation for the more general class of hyperbolic metric spaces due to Gromov. Gromov's proof is given below for the Poincaré unit disk; the properties of hyperbolic metric spaces are developed in the course of the proof, so that it applies mutatis mutandi to CAT(-1) or hyperbolic metric spaces.

Since this is a large-scale phenomenon, it is enough to check that any maps Δ from {0, 1, 2, ..., N} for any N > 0 to the disk satisfying the inequalities is within a Hausdorff distance R_{1} of the geodesic segment [Δ(0),Δ(N)]. For then translating it may be assumed without loss of generality Γ is defined on [0,r] with r > 1 and then, taking N = [r] (the integer part of r), the result can be applied to Δ defined by Δ(i) = Γ(i). The Hausdorff distance between the images of Γ and Δ is evidently bounded by a constant R_{2} depending only on λ and ε.

Now the incircle of a geodesic triangle has diameter less than δ where δ = 2 log 3; indeed it is strictly maximised by that of an ideal triangle where it equals 2 log 3. In particular, since the incircle breaks the triangle breaks the triangle into three isosceles triangles with the third side opposite the vertex of the original triangle having length less than δ, it follows that every side of a geodesic triangle is contained in a δ-neighbourhood of the other two sides. A simple induction argument shows that a geodesic polygon with 2^{k} + 2 vertices for k ≥ 0 has each side within a (k + 1)δ neighbourhood of the other sides (such a polygon is made by combining two geodesic polygons with 2^{k−1} + 1 sides along a common side). Hence if M ≤ 2^{k} + 2, the same estimate holds for a polygon with M sides.

For y_{i} = Δ(i) let f(x) = min d(x,y_{i}), the largest radius for a closed ball centred on x which contains no y_{i} in its interior. This is a continuous function non-zero on [Δ(0),Δ(N)] so attains its maximum h at some point x in this segment. Then [Δ(0),Δ(N)] lies within an h_{1}-neighbourhood of the image of Δ for any h_{1} > h. It therefore suffices to find an upper bound for h independent of N.

Choose y and z in the segment [Δ(0),Δ(N)] before and after x with d(x,y) = 2h and d(x,z) = 2h (or an endpoint if it within a distance of less than 2h from x). Then there are i, j with d(y,Δ(i)), d(z,Δ(j)) ≤ h. Hence d(Δ(i),Δ(j)) ≤ 6h, so that | i − j | ≤ 6λh + λε. By the triangle inequality all points on the segments [y,Δ(i)] and [z,Δ(j)] are at a distance ≥ h from x. Thus there is a finite sequence of points starting at y and ending at z, lying first on the segment [y,Δ(i)], then proceeding through the points Δ(i), Δ(i+1), ..., Δ(j), before taking the segment [Δ(j),z]. The successive points Δ(i), Δ(i+1), ..., Δ(j) are separated by a distance no greater than λ + ε and successive points on the geodesic segments can also be chosen to satisfy this condition. The minimum number K of points in such a sequence satisfies K ≤ | i - j | + 3 + 2(λ + ε)^{–1}h. These points form a geodesic polygon, with [y,z] as one of the sides. Take L = [h/δ], so that the (L − 1)δ-neighbourhood of [y,z] does not contain all the other sides of the polygon. Hence, from the result above, it follows that K > 2^{L − 1} + 2. Hence

$$3 + 2(\lambda+\varepsilon)^{-1}h + 6\lambda h + \varepsilon> 2^{h/\delta} + 2.$$

This inequality implies that h is uniformly bounded, independently of N, as claimed.

If all points Δ(i) lie within h_{1} of the [Δ(0),Δ(N)], the result follows. Otherwise the points which do not fall into maximal subsets S = {r, ..., s} with r < s. Thus points in [Δ(0),Δ(N)] have a point Δ(i) with i in the complement of S within a distance of h_{1}. But the complement of S = S_{1} ∐ S_{2}, a disjoint union with S_{1} = {0, ..., r − 1} and S_{2} = {s + 1, ..., N}. Connectivity of [Δ(0),Δ(N)] implies there is a point x in the segment which is within a distance h_{1} of points Δ(i) and Δ(j) with i < r and j > s. But then d(Δ(i),Δ(j)) < 2 h_{1}, so | i − j | ≤ 2λh_{1} + λε. Hence the points Δ(k) for k in S lie within a distance from [Δ(0),Δ(N)] of less than h_{1} + λ | i − j | + ε ≤ h_{1} + λ (2λh_{1} + λε) + ε ≡ h_{2}.

=== Extension to quasigeodesic rays and lines ===
Recall that in a Hadamard space if [a_{1},b_{1}] and [a_{2},b_{2}] are two geodesic segments and the intermediate points c_{1}(t) and c_{2}(t) divide them in the ratio t:(1 – t), then d(c_{1}(t),c_{2}(t)) is a convex function of t. In particular if Γ_{1}(t) and Γ_{2}(t) are geodesic segments of unit speed defined on [0,R] starting at the same point then

$$d(\Gamma_1(t),\Gamma_2(t)) \le {t\over R} d(\Gamma_1(R),\Gamma_2(R)).$$

In particular this implies the following:

- In a CAT(–1) space X, there is a constant h > 0 depending only on λ and ε such that any quasi-geodesic ray is within a bounded Hausdorff distance h of a geodesic ray. A similar result holds for quasigeodesic and geodesic lines.

If Γ(t) is a geodesic say with constant λ and ε, let Γ_{N}(t) be the unit speed geodesic for the segment [Γ(0),Γ(N)]. The estimate above shows that for fixed R > 0 and N sufficiently large, (Γ_{N}) is a Cauchy sequence in C([0,R],X) with the uniform metric. Thus Γ_{N} tends to a geodesic ray γ uniformly on compacta the bound on the Hausdorff distances between Γ and the segments Γ_{N} applies also to the limiting geodesic γ. The assertion for quasigeodesic lines follows by taking Γ_{N} corresponding to the geodesic segment [Γ(–N),Γ(N)].

== Efremovich–Tikhomirova theorem ==
Before discussing CAT(-1) spaces, this section will describe the Efremovich–Tikhomirova theorem for the unit disk D with the Poincaré metric. It asserts that quasi-isometries of D extend to quasi-Möbius homeomorphisms of the unit disk with the Euclidean metric. The theorem forms the prototype for the more general theory of CAT(-1) spaces. Their original theorem was proved in a slightly less general and less precise form in Efremovich & Tikhomirova (1964) and applied to bi-Lipschitz homeomorphisms of the unit disk for the Poincaré metric; earlier, in the posthumous paper Mori (1957), the Japanese mathematician Akira Mori had proved a related result within Teichmüller theory assuring that every quasiconformal homeomorphism of the disk is Hölder continuous and therefore extends continuously to a homeomorphism of the unit circle (it is known that this extension is quasi-Möbius).

=== Extension of quasi-isometries to boundary ===
If X is the Poincaré unit disk, or more generally a CAT(-1) space, the Morse lemma on stability of quasigeodesics implies that every quasi-isometry of X extends uniquely to the boundary. By definition two self-mappings f, g of X are quasi-equivalent if sup_{X} d(f(x),g(x)) < ∞, so that corresponding points are at a uniformly bounded distance of each other. A quasi-isometry f_{1} of X is a self-mapping of X, not necessarily continuous, which has a quasi-inverse f_{2} such that f_{1} ∘ f_{2} and f_{2} ∘ f_{1} are quasi-equivalent to the appropriate identity maps and such that there are constants λ ≥ 1 and ε > 0 such that for all x, y in X and both mappings

$$\lambda^{-1} d(x,y) - \varepsilon \le d(f_k(x),f_k(y)) \le \lambda d(x,y) +\varepsilon.$$

Note that quasi-inverses are unique up to quasi-equivalence; that equivalent definition could be given using possibly different right and left-quasi inverses, but they would necessarily be quasi-equivalent; that quasi-isometries are closed under composition which up to quasi-equivalence depends only the quasi-equivalence classes; and that, modulo quasi-equivalence, the quasi-isometries form a group.

Fixing a point x in X, given a geodesic ray γ starting at x, the image f ∘ γ under a quasi-isometry f is a quasi-geodesic ray. By the Morse-Mostow lemma it is within a bounded distance of a unique geodesic ray δ starting at x. This defines a mapping ∂f on the boundary ∂X of X, independent of the quasi-equivalence class of f, such that ∂(f ∘ g) = ∂f ∘ ∂g. Thus there is a homomorphism of the group of quasi-isometries into the group of self-mappings of ∂X.

To check that ∂f is continuous, note that if γ_{1} and γ_{2} are geodesic rays that are uniformly close on [0,R], within a distance η, then f ∘ γ_{1} and f ∘ γ_{2} lie within a distance λη + ε on [0,R], so that δ_{1} and δ_{2} lie within a distance λη + ε + 2h(λ,ε); hence on a smaller interval [0,r], δ_{1} and δ_{2} lie within a distance (r/R)⋅[λη + ε + 2h(λ,ε)] by convexity.

On CAT(-1) spaces, a finer version of continuity asserts that ∂f is a quasi-Möbius mapping with respect to a natural class of metric on ∂X, the "visual metrics" generalising the Euclidean metric on the unit circle and its transforms under the Möbius group. These visual metrics can be defined in terms of Busemann functions.

In the case of the unit disk, Teichmüller theory implies that the homomorphism carries quasiconformal homeomorphisms of the disk onto the group of quasi-Möbius homeomorphisms of the circle (using for example the Ahlfors–Beurling or Douady–Earle extension): it follows that the homomorphism from the quasi-isometry group into the quasi-Möbius group is surjective.

In the other direction, it is straightforward to prove that the homomorphism is injective. Suppose that f is a quasi-isometry of the unit disk such that ∂f is the identity. The assumption and the Morse lemma implies that if γ(R) is a geodesic line, then f(γ(R)) lies in an h-neighbourhood of γ(R). Now take a second geodesic line δ such that δ and γ intersect orthogonally at a given point in a. Then f(a) lies in the intersection of h-neighbourhoods of δ and γ. Applying a Möbius transformation, it can be assumed that a is at the origin of the unit disk and the geodesics are the real and imaginary axes. By convexity, the h-neighbourhoods of these axes intersect in a 3h-neighbourhood of the origin: if z lies in both neighbourhoods, let x and y be the orthogonal projections of z onto the x- and y-axes; then d(z,x) ≤ h so taking projections onto the y-axis, d(0,y) ≤ h; hence d(z,0) ≤ d(z,y) + d(y,0) ≤ 2h. Hence d(a,f(a)) ≤ 2h, so that f is quasi-equivalent to the identity, as claimed.

=== Cross ratio and distance between non-intersecting geodesic lines ===
Given two distinct points z, w on the unit circle or real axis there is a unique hyperbolic geodesic [z,w] joining them. It is given by the circle (or straight line) which cuts the unit circle unit circle or real axis orthogonally at those two points. Given four distinct points a, b, c, d in the extended complex plane their cross ratio is defined by

$$(a,b;c,d) ={(a-c)(b-d)\over (a-d)(b-c)}.$$

If g is a complex Möbius transformation then it leaves the cross ratio invariant: (g(a),g(b);g(c),g(d)) = (a,b:c,d). Since the Möbius group acts simply transitively on triples of points, the cross ratio can alternatively be described as the complex number z in C\{0,1} such that g(a) = 0, g(b) = 1, g(c) = λ, g(d) = ∞ for a Möbius transformation g.

Since a, b, c and d all appear in the numerator defining the cross ratio, to understand the behaviour of the cross ratio under permutations of a, b, c and d, it suffices to consider permutations that fix d, so only permute a, b and c. The cross ratio transforms according to the anharmonic group of order 6 generated by the Möbius transformations sending λ to 1 – λ and λ^{−1}. The other three transformations send λ to 1 – λ^{−1}, to λ(λ – 1)^{−1} and to (1 – λ)^{−1}.

Now let a, b, c, d be points on the unit circle or real axis in that order. Then the geodesics [a,b] and [c,d] do not intersect and the distance between these geodesics is well defined: there is a unique geodesic line cutting these two geodesics orthogonally and the distance is given by the length of the geodesic segment between them. It is evidently invariant under real Möbius transformations. To compare the cross ratio and the distance between geodesics, Möbius invariance allows the calculation to be reduced to a symmetric configuration. For 0 < r < R, take a = –R, b = −r, c = r, d = R. Then λ = (a,b;c,d) = (R + r)^{2}/4rR = (t + 1)^{2}/4t where t = R/r > 1. On the other hand, the geodesics [a,d] and [b,c] are the semicircles in the upper half plane of radius r and R. The geodesic which cuts them orthogonally is the positive imaginary axis, so the distance between them is the hyperbolic distance between ir and iR, d(ir,iR) = log R/r = log t. Let s = log t, then λ = cosh^{2}(s/2), so that there is a constant C > 0 such that, if (a,b;c,d) > 1, then

$$d([a,d];[b,c]) - C \le \log (a,b;c,d) \le d([a,d];[b,c]) + C,$$

since log[cosh(x)/expx)] = log (1 + exp(–2x))/2 is bounded above and below in x ≥ 0. Note that a, b, c, d are in order around the unit circle if and only if (a,b;c,d) > 1.

A more general and precise geometric interpretation of the cross ratio can be given using projections of ideal points on to a geodesic line; it does not depend on the order of the points on the circle and therefore whether or not geodesic lines intersect.

- If p and q are the feet of the perpendiculars from c and d to the geodesic line ab, then d(p,q) = | log | (a,b;c,d) ||.

Since both sides are invariant under Möbius transformations, it suffices to check this in the case that a = 0, b = ∞, c = x and d = 1. In this case the geodesic line is the positive imaginary axis, right hand side equals | log | x ||, p = | x | i and q = i. So the left hand side equals | log | x ||. Note that p and q are also the points where the incircles of the ideal triangles abc and abd touch ab.

=== Proof of theorem ===
A homeomorphism F of the circle is quasisymmetric if there are constants a, b > 0 such that

$$\displaystyle{{|F(z_1)-F(z_2)|\over |F(z_1)-F(z_3)|} \le a {|z_1-z_2|^b\over |z_1-z_3|^b}.}$$

It is quasi-Möbius is there are constants c, d > 0 such that

$$\displaystyle{|(F(z_1),F(z_2);F(z_3),F(z_4))| \le c |(z_1,z_2;z_3,z_4)|^d,}$$

where

$$\displaystyle{ (z_1,z_2;z_3,z_4)={(z_1-z_3)(z_2-z_4)\over(z_2-z_3)(z_1-z_4)}}$$

denotes the cross-ratio.

It is immediate that quasisymmetric and quasi-Möbius homeomorphisms are closed under the operations of inversion and composition.

If F is quasisymmetric then it is also quasi-Möbius, with c = a^{2} and d = b: this follows by multiplying the first inequality for (z_{1},z_{3},z_{4}) and (z_{2},z_{4},z_{3}). Conversely any quasi-Möbius homeomorphism F is quasisymmetric. To see this, it can be first be checked that F (and hence F^{−1}) is Hölder continuous. Let S be the set of cube roots of unity, so that if a ≠ b in S, then | a − b | = 2 sin π/3 = √3. To prove a Hölder estimate, it can be assumed that x – y is uniformly small. Then both x and y are greater than a fixed distance away from a, b in S with a ≠ b, so the estimate follows by applying the quasi-Möbius inequality to x, a, y, b. To verify that F is quasisymmetric, it suffices to find a uniform upper bound for | F(x) − F(y) | / | F(x) − F(z) | in the case of a triple with | x − z | = | x − y |, uniformly small. In this case there is a point w at a distance greater than 1 from x, y and z. Applying the quasi-Möbius inequality to x, w, y and z yields the required upper bound. To summarise:

- A homeomorphism of the circle is quasi-Möbius if and only if it is quasisymmetric. In this case it and its inverse are Hölder continuous. The quasi-Möbius homeomorphisms form a group under composition.

To prove the theorem it suffices to prove that if F = ∂f then there are constants A, B > 0 such that for a, b, c, d distinct points on the unit circle

$$\displaystyle{|(F(a),F(b);F(c),F(d))| \le A |(a,b;c,d)|^B.}$$

It has already been checked that F (and is inverse) are continuous. Composing f, and hence F, with complex conjugation if necessary, it can further be assumed that F preserves the orientation of the circle. In this case, if a,b, c,d are in order on the circle, so too are there images under F; hence both (a,b;c,d) and (F(a),F(b);F(c),F(d)) are real and greater than one. In this case

$$(F(a),F(b);F(c),F(d)) \le A (a,b;c,d)^B.$$

To prove this, it suffices to show that log (F(a),F(b);F(c),F(d)) ≤ B log (a,b;c,d) + C. From the previous section it suffices show d([F(a),F(b)],[F(c),F(d)]) ≤ P d([a,b],[c,d]) + Q. This follows from the fact that the images under f of [a,b] and [c,d] lie within h-neighbourhoods of [F(a),F(b)] and [F(c),F(d)]; the minimal distance can be estimated using the quasi-isometry constants for f applied to the points on [a,b] and [c,d] realising d([a,b],[c,d]).

Adjusting A and B if necessary, the inequality above applies also to F^{−1}. Replacing a, b, c and d by their images under F, it follows that

$$A^{-1} |(a,b;c,d)|^{-B} \le |(F(a),F(b);F(c),F(d))| \le A |(a,b;c,d)|^B$$

if a, b, c and d are in order on the unit circle. Hence the same inequalities are valid for the three cyclic of the quadruple a, b, c, d. If a and b are switched then the cross ratios are sent to their inverses, so lie between 0 and 1; similarly if c and d are switched. If both pairs are switched, the cross ratio remains unaltered. Hence the inequalities are also valid in this case. Finally if b and c are interchanged, the cross ratio changes from λ to λ^{–1} (λ – 1) = 1 – λ^{–1}, which lies between 0 and 1. Hence again the same inequalities are valid. It is easy to check that using these transformations the inequalities are valid for all possible permutations of a, b, c and d, so that F and its inverse are quasi-Möbius homeomorphisms.

== Busemann functions and visual metrics for CAT(-1) spaces ==
Busemann functions can be used to determine special visual metrics on the class of CAT(-1) spaces. These are complete geodesic metric spaces in which the distances between points on the boundary of a geodesic triangle are less than or equal to the comparison triangle in the hyperbolic upper half plane or equivalently the unit disk with the Poincaré metric. In the case of the unit disk the chordal metric can be recovered directly using Busemann functions B_{γ} and the special theory for the disk generalises completely to any proper CAT(-1) space X. The hyperbolic upper half plane is a CAT(0) space, as lengths in a hyperbolic geodesic triangle are less than lengths in the Euclidean comparison triangle: in particular a CAT(-1) space is a CAT(0) space, so the theory of Busemann functions and the Gromov boundary applies. From the theory of the hyperbolic disk, it follows in particular that every geodesic ray in a CAT(-1) space extends to a geodesic line and given two points of the boundary there is a unique geodesic γ such that has these points as the limits γ(±∞). The theory applies equally well to any CAT(−κ) space with κ > 0 since these arise by scaling the metric on a CAT(-1) space by κ^{−1/2}. On the hyperbolic unit disk D quasi-isometries of D induce quasi-Möbius homeomorphisms of the boundary in a functorial way. There is a more general theory of Gromov hyperbolic spaces, a similar statement holds, but with less precise control on the homeomorphisms of the boundary.

== Applications in percolation theory ==
More recently Busemann functions have been used by probabilists to study asymptotic properties in models of first-passage percolation and directed last-passage percolation.
