= Reshetnyak =

Reshetnyak is a surname. Notable people with the surname include:

- Aleksandr Reshetnyak (born 1948), Russian footballer and coach
- Viktor Reshetniak (1950–2015), Ukrainian Mayor of Vyshhorod
- Yurii Reshetnyak (1929–2021), Soviet Russian mathematician and academian
