= Tits metric =

Special type of metric in geometry

In mathematics, the Tits metric is a metric defined on the ideal boundary of an Hadamard space (also called a complete CAT(0) space). It is named after Jacques Tits.

== Ideal boundary of an Hadamard space ==
Let (X, d) be an Hadamard space. Two geodesic rays c_{1}, c_{2} : [0, ∞] → X are called asymptotic if they stay within a certain distance when traveling, i.e.

$$\sup_{t \ge 0} d(c_1(t), c_2(t)) < \infty.$$

Equivalently, the Hausdorff distance between the two rays is finite.

The asymptotic property defines an equivalence relation on the set of geodesic rays, and the set of equivalence classes is called the ideal boundary ∂X of X. An equivalence class of geodesic rays is called a boundary point of X. For any equivalence class of rays and any point p in X, there is a unique ray in the class that issues from p.

== Definition of the Tits metric ==
First we define an angle between boundary points with respect to a point p in X. For any two boundary points $\xi_1, \xi_2$ in ∂X, take the two geodesic rays c_{1}, c_{2} issuing from p corresponding to the two boundary points respectively. One can define an angle of the two rays at p called the Alexandrov angle. Intuitively, take the triangle with vertices p, c_{1}(t), c_{2}(t) for a small t, and construct a triangle in the flat plane with the same side lengths as this triangle (see comparison triangle). Consider the angle at the vertex of the flat triangle corresponding to p. The limit of this angle when t goes to zero is defined as the Alexandrov angle of the two rays at p. (By definition of a CAT(0) space, the angle monotonically decreases as t decreases, so the limit exists.) Now define $\angle_p(\xi_1, \xi_2)$ to be this angle.

To define the angular metric on the boundary ∂X that does not depend on the choice of p, take the supremum over all points in X

$\angle(\xi_1, \xi_2) := \sup_{p\in X}\angle_p(\xi_1, \xi_2).$

The Tits metric d_{T} is the length metric associated to the angular metric, that is for any two boundary points, the Tits distance between them is the infimum of lengths of all the curves on the boundary that connect them measured in the angular metric. If there is no such curve with finite length, the Tits distance between the two points is infinite.

The ideal boundary of X equipped with the Tits metric is called the Tits boundary, denoted as ∂_{T}X.

For a complete CAT(0) space, it can be shown that its ideal boundary with the angular metric is a complete CAT(1) space, and its Tits boundary is also a complete CAT(1) space. Thus for any two boundary points $\xi_1, \xi_2$ such that $\angle(\xi_1, \xi_2) < \pi$, we have

$$d_\mathrm{T}(\xi_1, \xi_2) = \angle(\xi_1,\xi_2),$$

and the points can be joined by a unique geodesic segment on the boundary. If the space is proper, then any two boundary points at finite Tits distance apart can be joined by a geodesic segment on the boundary.

== Examples ==
- For a Euclidean space E^{n}, its Tits boundary is the unit sphere S^{n - 1}.
- An Hadamard space X is called a visibility space if any two distinct boundary points are the endpoints of a geodesic line in X. For such a space, the angular distance between any two boundary points is equal to π, so there is no curve with finite length on the ideal boundary that connects any two distinct boundary points, which means that the Tits distance between any two of them is infinity.
