= Preissmann's theorem =

Restricts the possible topology of a negatively curved compact Riemannian manifold

In Riemannian geometry, a field of mathematics, Preissmann's theorem is a statement that restricts the possible topology of a negatively curved compact Riemannian manifold. It is named for Alexandre Preissmann, who published a proof in 1943.

== Preissmann's theorem ==
Consider a closed manifold with a Riemannian metric of negative sectional curvature. Preissmann's theorem states that every non-trivial abelian subgroup of the fundamental group must be isomorphic to the additive group of integers, ℤ. This can loosely be interpreted as saying that the fundamental group of such a manifold must be highly nonabelian. Moreover, the fundamental group itself cannot be abelian.

As an example, Preissmann's theorem implies that the n-dimensional torus admits no Riemannian metric of strictly negative sectional curvature. More generally, the product of two closed manifolds of positive dimensions does not admit a Riemannian metric of strictly negative sectional curvature.

The standard proof of Preissmann's theorem deals with the constraints that negative curvature makes on the lengths and angles of geodesics. However, it may also be proved by techniques of partial differential equations, as a direct corollary of James Eells and Joseph Sampson's foundational theorem on harmonic maps.

Preissmann's theorem is a special case of Gromov's classification of subgroups in hyperbolic groups. Indeed, the fundamental group of a compact manifold of negative sectional curvature is torsion-free, and its action on the universal cover of the manifold implies that it is a Gromov-hyperbolic group (the universal cover itself is CAT(-ε) for some ε > 0, hence a Gromov-hyperbolic space). Hence its infinite abelian subgroups are virtually isomorphic to ℤ, and since they are torsion-free they are isomorphic to ℤ.

== Flat torus theorem ==
Preissmann's theorem may be viewed as a special case of the more powerful flat torus theorem obtained by Detlef Gromoll and Joseph A. Wolf, and independently by Blaine Lawson and Shing-Tung Yau. This establishes that, under nonpositivity of the sectional curvature, abelian subgroups of the fundamental group are represented by geometrically special submanifolds: totally geodesic isometric immersions of a flat torus.

There is a well-developed theory of Alexandrov spaces which extends the theory of upper bounds on sectional curvature to the context of metric spaces. The flat torus theorem, along with the special case of Preissmann's theorem, can be put into this broader context.
