= Uniformly disconnected space =

In mathematics, a uniformly disconnected space is a metric space $(X,d)$ for which there exists $\lambda > 0$ such that no pair of distinct points $x,y \in X$ can be connected by a $\lambda$-chain. A $\lambda$-chain between $x$ and $y$ is a sequence of points $x= x_0, x_1, \ldots, x_n = y$ in $X$ such that $d(x_i,x_{i+1}) \leq \lambda d(x,y), \forall i \in \{0,\ldots,n\}$.

== Properties ==
Uniform disconnectedness is invariant under quasi-Möbius maps.
