= Cartan–Hadamard theorem =

On the structure of complete Riemannian manifolds of non-positive sectional curvature

In mathematics, the Cartan–Hadamard theorem is a statement in Riemannian geometry concerning the structure of complete Riemannian manifolds of non-positive sectional curvature. The theorem states that the universal cover of such a manifold is diffeomorphic to a Euclidean space via the exponential map at any point. It was first proved by Hans Carl Friedrich von Mangoldt for surfaces in 1881, and independently by Jacques Hadamard in 1898. Élie Cartan generalized the theorem to Riemannian manifolds in 1928 (Helgason 1978; do Carmo 1992; Kobayashi & Nomizu 1969). The theorem was further generalized to a wide class of metric spaces by Mikhail Gromov in 1987; detailed proofs were published by Ballmann (1990) for metric spaces of non-positive curvature and by Alexander & Bishop (1990) for general locally convex metric spaces.

== Riemannian geometry ==
The Cartan–Hadamard theorem in conventional Riemannian geometry asserts that the universal covering space of a connected complete Riemannian manifold of non-positive sectional curvature is diffeomorphic to R^{n}. In fact, for complete manifolds of non-positive curvature, the exponential map based at any point of the manifold is a covering map.

The theorem holds also for Hilbert manifolds in the sense that the exponential map of a non-positively curved geodesically complete connected manifold is a covering map (McAlpin 1965; Lang 1999, IX, §3). Completeness here is understood in the sense that the exponential map is defined on the whole tangent space of a point.

== Metric geometry ==
In metric geometry, the Cartan–Hadamard theorem is the statement that the universal cover of a connected non-positively curved complete metric space X is a Hadamard space. In particular, if X is simply connected then it is a geodesic space in the sense that any two points are connected by a unique minimizing geodesic, and hence contractible.

A metric space X is said to be non-positively curved if every point p has a neighborhood U in which any two points are joined by a geodesic, and for any point z in U and constant speed geodesic γ in U, one has

$$d(z,\gamma(1/2))^2 \le \frac{1}{2}d(z,\gamma(0))^2 + \frac{1}{2}d(z,\gamma(1))^2 - \frac{1}{4}d(\gamma(0),\gamma(1))^2.$$

This inequality may be usefully thought of in terms of a geodesic triangle Δ = zγ(0)γ(1). The left-hand side is the square distance from the vertex z to the midpoint of the opposite side. The right-hand side represents the square distance from the vertex to the midpoint of the opposite side in a Euclidean triangle having the same side lengths as Δ. This condition, called the CAT(0) condition is an abstract form of Toponogov's triangle comparison theorem.

=== Generalization to locally convex spaces ===
The assumption of non-positive curvature can be weakened (Alexander & Bishop 1990), although with a correspondingly weaker conclusion. Call a metric space X convex if, for any two constant speed minimizing geodesics a(t) and b(t), the function

$$t\mapsto d(a(t),b(t))$$

is a convex function of t. A metric space is then locally convex if every point has a neighborhood that is convex in this sense. The Cartan–Hadamard theorem for locally convex spaces states:

- If X is a locally convex complete connected metric space, then the universal cover of X is a convex geodesic space with respect to the induced length metric d.

In particular, the universal covering of such a space is contractible. The convexity of the distance function along a pair of geodesics is a well-known consequence of non-positive curvature of a metric space, but it is not equivalent (Ballmann 1990).

== Significance ==
The Cartan–Hadamard theorem provides an example of a local-to-global correspondence in Riemannian and metric geometry: namely, a local condition (non-positive curvature) and a global condition (simple-connectedness) together imply a strong global property (contractibility); or in the Riemannian case, diffeomorphism with R^{n}.

The metric form of the theorem demonstrates that a non-positively curved polyhedral cell complex is aspherical. This fact is of crucial importance for modern geometric group theory.

== See also ==
- Glossary of Riemannian and metric geometry
- Cartan–Hadamard manifold
- Cartan–Hadamard conjecture
