= Glossary of Riemannian and metric geometry =

This is a glossary of some terms used in Riemannian geometry and metric geometry — it doesn't cover the terminology of differential topology.

The following articles may also be useful; they either contain specialised vocabulary or provide more detailed expositions of the definitions given below.

- Connection
- Curvature
- Metric space
- Riemannian manifold

See also:

- Glossary of general topology
- Glossary of differential geometry and topology
- List of differential geometry topics

Unless stated otherwise, letters X, Y, Z below denote metric spaces, M, N denote Riemannian manifolds, |xy| or $|xy|_X$ denotes the distance between points x and y in X. Italic word denotes a self-reference to this glossary.

A caveat: many terms in Riemannian and metric geometry, such as convex function, convex set and others, do not have exactly the same meaning as in general mathematical usage.

== A ==
Affine connection

Alexandrov space a generalization of Riemannian manifolds with upper, lower or integral curvature bounds (the last one works only in dimension 2).

Almost flat manifold

Arc-wise isometry the same as path isometry.

Asymptotic cone

Autoparallel the same as totally geodesic.

== B ==
Banach space

Barycenter, see center of mass.

Bi-Lipschitz map. A map $f:X\to Y$ is called bi-Lipschitz if there are positive constants c and C such that for any x and y in X

$$c|xy|_X\le|f(x)f(y)|_Y\le C|xy|_X.$$

Boundary at infinity. In general, a construction that may be regarded as a space of directions at infinity. For geometric examples, see for instance hyperbolic boundary, Gromov boundary, visual boundary, Tits boundary, Thurston boundary. See also projective space and compactification.

Busemann function given a ray, γ : [0, ∞)→X, the Busemann function is defined by
$$B_\gamma(p)=\lim_{t\to\infty}(|\gamma(t)-p|-t).$$

== C ==
Cartan connection

Cartan-Hadamard space is a complete, simply-connected, non-positively curved Riemannian manifold.

Cartan–Hadamard theorem is the statement that a connected, simply connected complete Riemannian manifold with non-positive sectional curvature is diffeomorphic to R^{n} via the exponential map; for metric spaces, the statement that a connected, simply connected complete geodesic metric space with non-positive curvature in the sense of Alexandrov is a (globally) CAT(0) space.

Cartan (Élie) The mathematician after whom Cartan-Hadamard manifolds, Cartan subalgebras, and Cartan connections are named (not to be confused with his son Henri Cartan).

$CAT(\kappa)$ space

Center of mass. A point $q\in M$ is called the center of mass of the points $p_1,p_2,\dots,p_k$ if it is a point of global minimum of the function

$$f(x)=\sum_i |p_ix|^2.$$

Such a point is unique if all distances $|p_ip_j|$ are less than the convexity radius.

Cheeger constant

Christoffel symbol

Coarse geometry

Collapsing manifold

Complete manifold According to the Riemannian Hopf-Rinow theorem, a Riemannian manifold is complete as a metric space, if and only if all geodesics can be infinitely extended.

Complete metric space

Completion

Complex hyperbolic space

Conformal map is a map which preserves angles.

Conformally flat a manifold M is conformally flat if it is locally conformally equivalent to a Euclidean space, for example standard sphere is conformally flat.

Conjugate points two points p and q on a geodesic $\gamma$ are called conjugate if there is a Jacobi field on $\gamma$ which has a zero at p and q.

Connection

Convex function. A function f on a Riemannian manifold is a convex if for any geodesic $\gamma$ the function $f\circ\gamma$ is convex. A function f is called $\lambda$-convex if for any geodesic $\gamma$ with natural parameter $t$, the function $f\circ\gamma(t)-\lambda t^2$ is convex.

Convex A subset K of a Riemannian manifold M is called convex if for any two points in K there is a unique shortest path connecting them which lies entirely in K, see also totally convex.

Convexity radius at a point $p$ of a Riemannian manifold is the supremum of radii of balls centered at $p$ that are (totally) convex. The convexity radius of the manifold is the infimum of the convexity radii at its points; for a compact manifold this is a positive number. Sometimes the additional requirement is made that the distance function to $p$ in these balls is convex.

Cotangent bundle

Covariant derivative

Cubical complex

Cut locus

== D ==
Diameter of a metric space is the supremum of distances between pairs of points.

Developable surface is a surface isometric to the plane.

Dilation same as Lipschitz constant.

== E ==
Ehresmann connection

Einstein manifold

Euclidean geometry

Exponential map Exponential map (Lie theory), Exponential map (Riemannian geometry)

== F ==
Finsler metric A generalization of Riemannian manifolds where the scalar product on the tangent space is replaced by a norm.

First fundamental form for an embedding or immersion is the pullback of the metric tensor.

Flat manifold

== G ==
Geodesic is a curve which locally minimizes distance.

Geodesic equation is the differential equation whose local solutions are the geodesics.

Geodesic flow is a flow on a tangent bundle TM of a manifold M, generated by a vector field whose trajectories are of the form $(\gamma(t),\gamma'(t))$ where $\gamma$ is a geodesic.

Gromov-Hausdorff convergence

Gromov-hyperbolic metric space

Geodesic metric space is a metric space where any two points are the endpoints of a minimizing geodesic.

== H ==
Hadamard space is a complete simply connected space with nonpositive curvature.

Hausdorff dimension

Hausdorff distance

Hausdorff measure

Hilbert space

Hölder map

Holonomy group is the subgroup of isometries of the tangent space obtained as parallel transport along closed curves.

Horosphere a level set of Busemann function.

Hyperbolic geometry (see also Riemannian hyperbolic space)

Hyperbolic link

== I ==
Injectivity radius The injectivity radius at a point p of a Riemannian manifold is the supremum of radii for which the exponential map at p is a diffeomorphism. The injectivity radius of a Riemannian manifold is the infimum of the injectivity radii at all points. See also cut locus.

For complete manifolds, if the injectivity radius at p is a finite number r, then either there is a geodesic of length 2r which starts and ends at p or there is a point q conjugate to p (see conjugate point above) and on the distance r from p. For a closed Riemannian manifold the injectivity radius is either half the minimal length of a closed geodesic or the minimal distance between conjugate points on a geodesic.

Infranilmanifold Given a simply connected nilpotent Lie group N acting on itself by left multiplication and a finite group of automorphisms F of N one can define an action of the semidirect product $N \rtimes F$ on N. An orbit space of N by a discrete subgroup of $N \rtimes F$ which acts freely on N is called an infranilmanifold. An infranilmanifold is finitely covered by a nilmanifold.

Isometric embedding is an embedding preserving the Riemannian metric.

Isometry is a surjective map which preserves distances.

Isoperimetric function of a metric space $X$ measures "how efficiently rectifiable loops are coarsely contractible with respect to their length". For the Cayley 2-complex of a finite presentation, they are equivalent to the Dehn function of the group presentation. They are invariant under quasi-isometries.

Intrinsic metric

== J ==
Jacobi field A Jacobi field is a vector field on a geodesic γ which can be obtained on the following way: Take a smooth one parameter family of geodesics $\gamma_\tau$ with $\gamma_0=\gamma$, then the Jacobi field is described by

$$J(t)=\left. \frac{\partial\gamma_\tau(t)}{\partial \tau} \right|_{\tau=0}.$$

Jordan curve

== K ==
Kähler-Einstein metric

Kähler metric

Killing vector field

Koszul Connection

== L ==
Length metric the same as intrinsic metric.

Length space

Levi-Civita connection is a natural way to differentiate vector fields on Riemannian manifolds.

Linear connection

Link

Lipschitz constant of a map is the infimum of numbers L such that the given map is L-Lipschitz.

Lipschitz convergence the convergence of metric spaces defined by Lipschitz distance.

Lipschitz distance between metric spaces is the infimum of numbers r such that there is a bijective bi-Lipschitz map between these spaces with constants exp(-r), exp(r).

Lipschitz map

Locally symmetric space

Logarithmic map, or logarithm, is a right inverse of Exponential map.

== M ==
Mean curvature

Metric ball

Metric tensor

Minkowski space

Minimal surface is a submanifold with (vector of) mean curvature zero.

Mostow's rigidity In dimension $\ge 3$, compact hyperbolic manifolds are classified by their fundamental group.

== N ==
Natural parametrization is the parametrization by length.

Net A subset S of a metric space X is called $\epsilon$-net if for any point in X there is a point in S on the distance $\le\epsilon$. This is distinct from topological nets which generalize limits.

Nilmanifold: An element of the minimal set of manifolds which includes a point, and has the following property: any oriented $S^1$-bundle over a nilmanifold is a nilmanifold. It also can be defined as a factor of a connected nilpotent Lie group by a lattice.

Normal bundle: associated to an embedding of a manifold M into an ambient Euclidean space ${\mathbb R}^N$, the normal bundle is a vector bundle whose fiber at each point p is the orthogonal complement (in ${\mathbb R}^N$) of the tangent space $T_pM$.

Nonexpanding map same as short map.

== O ==
Orbifold

Orthonormal frame bundle is the bundle of bases of the tangent space that are orthonormal for the Riemannian metric.

== P ==
Parallel transport

Path isometry

Pre-Hilbert space

Polish space

Polyhedral space a simplicial complex with a metric such that each simplex with induced metric is isometric to a simplex in Euclidean space.

Principal curvature is the maximum and minimum normal curvatures at a point on a surface.

Principal direction is the direction of the principal curvatures.

Product metric

Product Riemannian manifold

Proper metric space is a metric space in which every closed ball is compact. Equivalently, if every closed bounded subset is compact. Every proper metric space is complete.

Pseudo-Riemannian manifold

== Q ==
Quasi-convex subspace of a metric space $X$ is a subset $Y\subseteq X$ such that there exists $K\ge 0$ such that for all $y, y'\in Y$, for all geodesic segment $[y, y']$ and for all $z\in [y, y']$, $d(z, Y) \le K$.

Quasigeodesic has two meanings; here we give the most common. A map $f: I \to Y$ (where $I\subseteq \mathbb R$ is a subinterval) is called a quasigeodesic if there are constants $K \ge 1$ and $C \ge 0$ such that for every $x,y\in I$

$${1\over K}d(x,y)-C\le d(f(x),f(y))\le Kd(x,y)+C.$$

Note that a quasigeodesic is not necessarily a continuous curve.

Quasi-isometry. A map $f:X\to Y$ is called a quasi-isometry if there are constants $K \ge 1$ and $C \ge 0$ such that

$${1\over K}d(x,y)-C\le d(f(x),f(y))\le Kd(x,y)+C.$$

and every point in Y has distance at most C from some point of f(X). Note that a quasi-isometry is not assumed to be continuous. For example, any map between compact metric spaces is a quasi isometry. If there exists a quasi-isometry from X to Y, then X and Y are said to be quasi-isometric.

== R ==
Radius of metric space is the infimum of radii of metric balls which contain the space completely.

Ray is a one side infinite geodesic which is minimizing on each interval.

Real tree

Rectifiable curve

Ricci curvature

Riemann The mathematician after whom Riemannian geometry is named.

Riemannian angle

Riemann curvature tensor is often defined as the (4, 0)-tensor of the tangent bundle of a Riemannian manifold $(M, g)$ as
$$R_p(X, Y, Z)W = {g_p({\nabla_X \nabla_Y Z - \nabla_Y \nabla_X Z - \nabla_{[X, Y]} Z, W})},$$
for $p\in M$ and $X, Y, Z, W\in T_pM$ (depending on conventions, $X$ and $Y$ are sometimes switched).

Riemannian hyperbolic space

Riemannian manifold

Riemannian submanifold A differentiable sub-manifold whose Riemannian metric is the restriction of the ambient Riemannian metric (not to be confused with sub-Riemannian manifold).

Riemannian submersion is a map between Riemannian manifolds which is submersion and submetry at the same time.

== S ==
Scalar curvature

Second fundamental form is a quadratic form on the tangent space of hypersurface, usually denoted by II, an equivalent way to describe the shape operator of a hypersurface,

$$\text{II}(v,w)=\langle S(v),w\rangle.$$

It can be also generalized to arbitrary codimension, in which case it is a quadratic form with values in the normal space.

Sectional curvature at a point $p$ of a Riemannian manifold $M$ along the 2-plane spanned by two linearly independent vectors $u, v\in T_pM$ is the number
$$\sigma_p({Vect}(u, v)) = \frac{R_p(u, v, v, u)}{g_p(u, u)g_p(v, v) - g_p(u, v)^2}$$
where $R_p$ is the curvature tensor written as $R_p(X, Y, Z)W = {g_p({\nabla_X \nabla_Y Z - \nabla_Y \nabla_X Z - \nabla_{[X, Y]} Z, W})}$, and ${g_p}$ is the Riemannian metric.

Shape operator for a hypersurface M is a linear operator on tangent spaces, S_{p}: T_{p}M→T_{p}M. If n is a unit normal field to M and v is a tangent vector then

$$S(v)=\pm \nabla_{v}n$$

(there is no standard agreement whether to use + or − in the definition).

Short map is a distance non increasing map.

Smooth manifold

Sol manifold is a factor of a connected solvable Lie group by a lattice.

Spherical geometry

Submetry A short map f between metric spaces is called a submetry if there exists R > 0 such that for any point x and radius r < R the image of metric r-ball is an r-ball, i.e.
$$f(B_r(x))=B_r(f(x)).$$
Sub-Riemannian manifold

Symmetric space Riemannian symmetric spaces are Riemannian manifolds in which the geodesic reflection at any point is an isometry. They turn out to be quotients of a real Lie group by a maximal compact subgroup whose Lie algebra is the fixed subalgebra of the involution obtained by differentiating the geodesic symmetry. This algebraic data is enough to provide a classification of the Riemannian symmetric spaces.

Systole The k-systole of M, $syst_k(M)$, is the minimal volume of k-cycle nonhomologous to zero.

== T ==
Tangent bundle

Tangent cone

Thurston's geometries The eight 3-dimensional geometries predicted by Thurston's geometrization conjecture, proved by Perelman: $\mathbb{S}^3$, $\R\times\mathbb{S}^2$, $\mathbb{R}^3$, $\mathbb{R}\times \mathbb{H}^2$, $\mathbb{H}^3$, $\mathrm{Sol}$, $\mathrm{Nil}$, and $\widetilde{PSL}_2(\R)$.

Tits boundary

Totally convex A subset K of a Riemannian manifold M is called totally convex if for any two points in K any geodesic connecting them lies entirely in K, see also convex.

Totally geodesic submanifold is a submanifold such that all geodesics in the submanifold are also geodesics of the surrounding manifold.

Tree-graded space

== U ==
Uniquely geodesic metric space is a metric space where any two points are the endpoints of a unique minimizing geodesic.

== V ==
Variation

Volume form

== W ==
Word metric on a group is a metric of the Cayley graph constructed using a set of generators.
