= Reshetnyak gluing theorem =

On the structure of a geometric object built by joining other geometric objects

In metric geometry, the Reshetnyak gluing theorem gives information on the structure of a geometric object built by using as building blocks other geometric objects, belonging to a well defined class. Intuitively, it states that a space obtained by joining (i.e. "gluing") together, in a precisely defined way, other spaces having a given property inherit that very same property.

The theorem was first stated and proved by Yurii Reshetnyak in 1968.

== Statement ==
Theorem: Let $X_i$ be complete locally compact geodesic metric spaces of CAT curvature $\leq \kappa$, and $C_i\subset X_i$ convex subsets which are isometric. Then the manifold $X$, obtained by gluing all $X_i$ along all $C_i$, is also of CAT curvature $\leq \kappa$.

For an exposition and a proof of the Reshetnyak Gluing Theorem, see (Burago, Burago & Ivanov 2001, Theorem 9.1.21).
