= Victor Andreevich Toponogov =

Russian mathematician (1930–2004)

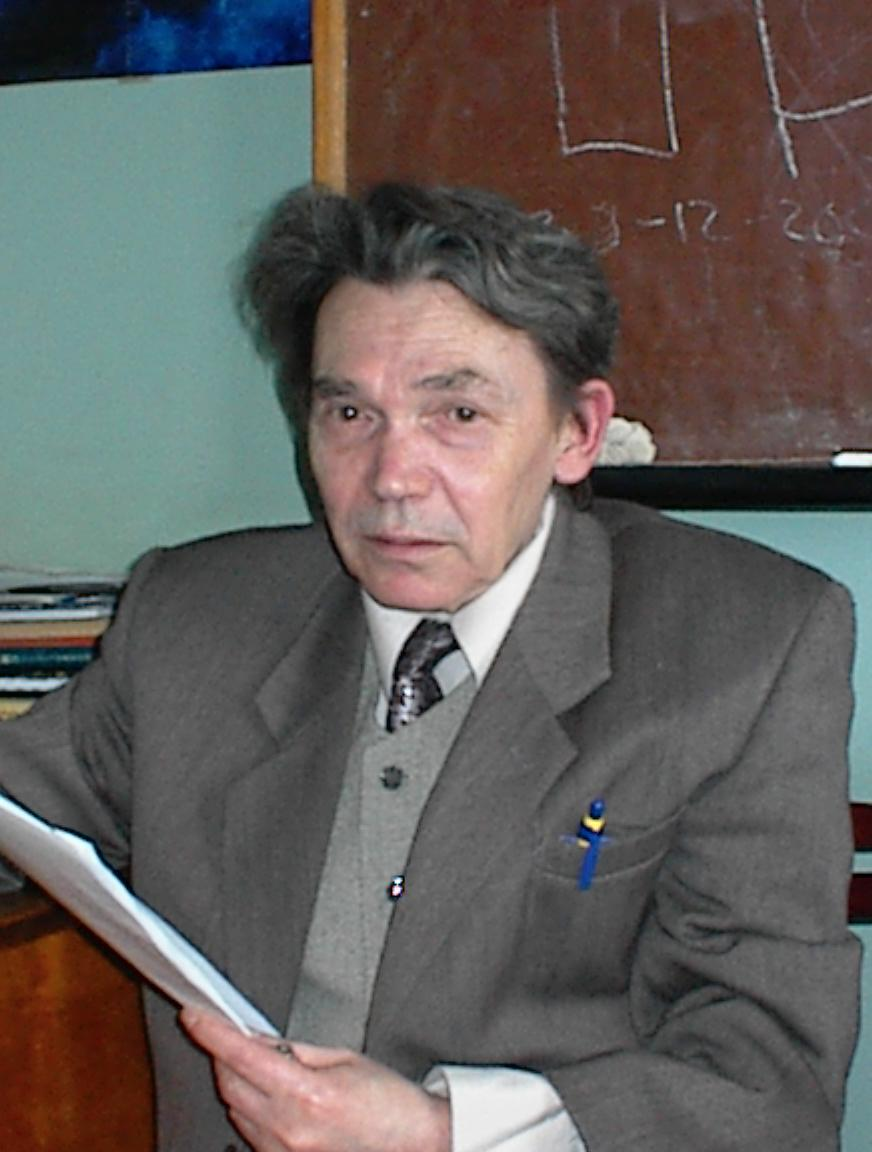
- Born: March 6, 1930; Tomsk, Soviet Russia
- Died: November 21, 2004 (aged 74); Novosibirsk, Russia
- Education: Tomsk State University
- Known for: Toponogov's theorem
- Spouse: Ljudmila Pavlovna Goncharova
- Scientific career
- Fields: Mathematics
- Doctoral advisor: Abram Ilyich Fet

Victor Andreevich Toponogov (Russian: Ви́ктор Андре́евич Топоно́гов; March 6, 1930 – November 21, 2004) was an outstanding Russian mathematician, noted for his contributions to differential geometry and so-called Riemannian geometry "in the large".

== Biography ==
After finishing secondary school in 1948, Toponogov entered the department of Mechanics and Mathematics at Tomsk State University, graduated with honours in 1953, and continued as a graduate student there until 1956. He moved to an institution in Novosibirsk in 1956 and lived in that city for the rest of his career. Since the institution at Novosibirsk had not yet been fully credentialed, he had defended his Ph.D. thesis at Moscow State University in 1958, on a subject in Riemann spaces. Novosibirsk State University was established in 1959. In 1961, Toponogov became a professor at a newly created Institute of Mathematics and Computing in Novosibirsk affiliated with the state university.

Toponogov's scientific interests were influenced by his advisor Abram Fet, who taught at Tomsk and later at Novosibirsk. Fet was a well-recognized topologist and specialist in variational calculus in the large. Toponogov's work was also strongly influenced by the work of Aleksandr Danilovich Aleksandrov. Later, the class of metric spaces known as CAT(k) spaces would be named after Élie Cartan, Aleksandrov and Toponogov.

Toponogov published over forty papers and some books during his career. His works are concentrated in Riemannian geometry "in the large". A significant number of his students also made notable contributions in this field.

== Conjecture on Complete Convex Surfaces ==
In 1995 Toponogov made the conjecture:

On a complete convex surface S homeomorphic to a plane the following equality holds:

$\inf_{p\in S}|\kappa_2(p)-\kappa_1(p)|=0,$

where $\kappa_1$ and $\kappa_2$ are the principal curvatures of S.

In words, it states that every complete convex surface homeomorphic to a plane must have an umbilic point which may lie at infinity. As such, it is the natural open analog of the Carathéodory conjecture for closed convex surfaces.

In the same paper, Toponogov proved the conjecture under either of two assumptions: the integral of the Gauss curvature is less than $2\pi$, or the Gauss curvature and the gradients of the curvatures are bounded on S. The conjecture was proven by Brendan Guilfoyle and Wilhelm Klingenberg in 2024 for $C^{3,\alpha }$-smooth surfaces.

== See also ==
- Toponogov's theorem
