= Boris Komrakov =

Russian mathematician (born 1948)

Boris Petrovich Komrakov (Борис Петрович Комраков; born 30 October 1948, in Ivano-Frankivsk) is a Russian mathematician, who works on Lie groups.

Komrakov received his PhD in 1991 at the University of Tartu in Estonia with thesis Primitive Actions and the Sophus Lie Problem; however, while living in Minsk he had published papers since the 1970s. He is a professor and the director of the International Sophus Lie Center founded in 1990 in Minsk; the center collaborates with the University of Oslo. In 1997 Komrakov received the Lobachevsky Medal fof his work on the theory of Lie groups, in particular for Primitive Actions and the Sophus Lie Problem and the book Structures on Manifolds and Homogeneous Spaces. Komrakov has contributed to the theory of the Lie groups with applications in differential geometry and the theory of differential equations.

== Selected works ==
- Structures on manifolds and homogeneous spaces, Minsk 1978 (in Russian)
- as editor: Lie groups and Lie algebras, their representations, generalizations and applications, Kluwer 1998
- Primitive Actions and the Sophus Lie Problem, Vysheshaya Shkola, Minsk 1991 (in Russian)
