= Abram Ilyich Fet =

Russian mathematician (1924–2009)

Abram Fet
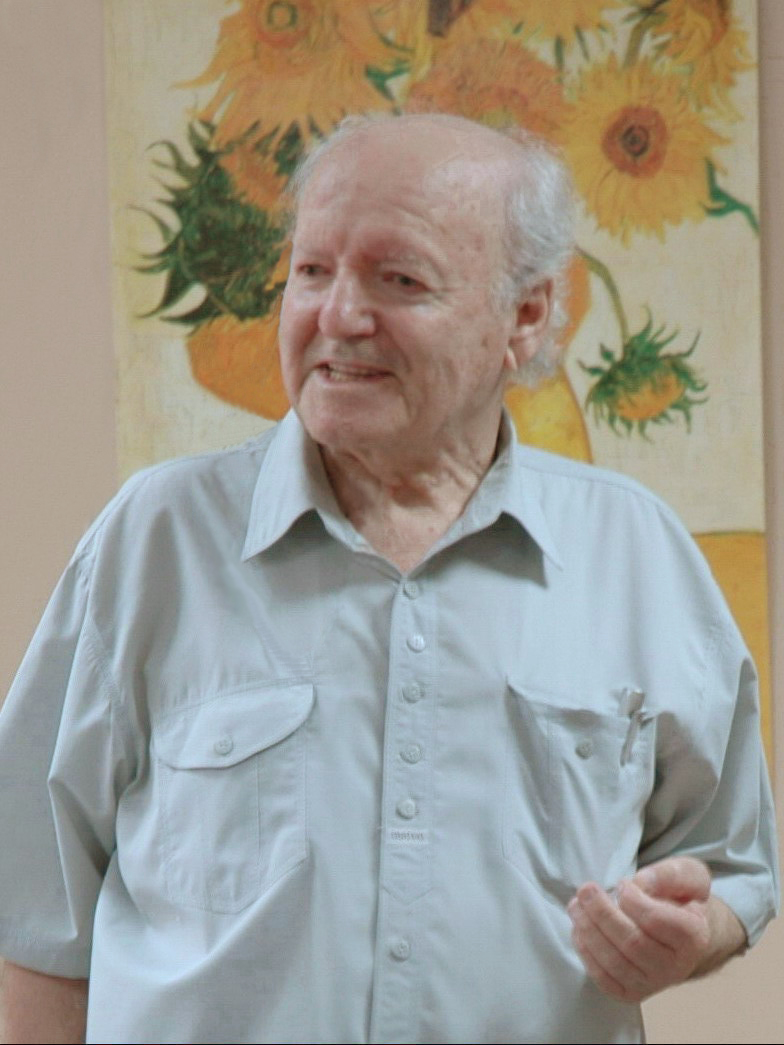
- Fet in 2006
- Born: 5 December 1924; Odesa, Ukrainian SSR, USSR
- Died: 30 July 2009 (aged 84); Novosibirsk, Russia
- Education: Tomsk University; Moscow University
- Scientific career
- Fields: Mathematics, physics
- Workplaces: Sobolev Institute of Mathematics; Novosibirsk State University
- Notable students: Victor Andreevich Toponogov

Abram Fet (Russian: Абрам Ильич Фет, Ukrainian: Абрам Ілліч Фет) (5 December 1924 — 30 July 2009) was a Russian mathematician, Soviet dissident, philosopher, Samizdat translator and writer. He used various pseudonyms for Samizdat, like N. A. Klenov, A.B. Nazyvayev, D.A. Rassudin, S.T. Karneyev, etc. If published, his translations were usually issued under the name of A.I. Fedorov, which reproduced Fet's own initials and sometimes under the names of real people who agreed to publish Fet's translations under their names.

== Biography ==
Abram Fet was born on 5 December 1924 in Odesa into a family of Ilya Fet and Revekka Nikolayevskaya. Ilya Fet was a medical doctor; he was born and grew in Rivne and studied medicine in Paris. Revekka was a housewife; she grew in Odesa. Fet's father often changed jobs, moving with his family over Ukraine looking for places where to escape starvation, and the children had to change schools. In 1936, the family settled in Odesa. There Abram Fet finished high school at the age of 15 and entered the Odesa Institute of Communications Engineering. He had hardly finished the first year when the Second World War broke out. Fet's family was evacuated to Siberia, to the Tomsk region. In 1941, Fet entered the Mathematics Department of Tomsk University, where he was admitted to the second year of studies. At that time, many professors evacuated from European Russia were teaching at the local university, among them Petr Rashchevsky who advised him in 1946 to continue his education in Moscow University. There Fet attended the seminars of Gelfand, Pontryagin, and Novikov and started to specialize in topology on advice of Vilenkin, under supervision of Lazar Lusternik.

In December 1948, Fet defended his Candidate Thesis named "A Homology Ring of Closed Curve Space on a Sphere", which was recognized as an outstanding contribution by the mathematicians of Moscow University. After graduation, he started working in Tomsk University as a junior lecturer and then an associate professor of the Calculus Department. Among others, he taught V. Toponogov and S. Alber. Beginning from 1955, Fet worked in various colleges of Novosibirsk. In 1960, he got employed as a senior researcher in the Ceometry and Topology Department of the newly established Institute of Mathematics of the Siberian Division of the Academy of Sciences of the USSR. At the same time, he also taught at the new Novosibirsk University.

In November 1967, he defended a doctorate at Moscow University named "A Periodic Problem of Variational Calculus", focused around Fet's theorem about two closed geodesic arcs, which became classical.

In 1968, Fet signed the "Letter of 46" in defense of imprisoned dissidents, which became the reason for his dismissal both from the research institute and from the university. The real reason, though, was not the very fact of signing the letter but his independent character and straightforwardness with which he spoke about the professional and human qualities of his co-workers, about the intrigues of functionaries in science and about the privileges in Academgorodok (a limited-access grocery shop for residents, a special medical center and other privileges for the science town management and for doctors of sciences and their families). During four years, from October 1968 to June 1972, Fet was unemployed, earning his living by doing technical translations and translating mathematical books from different languages, which his friends arranged for him, and continued his research.

Back in 1965, Fet began working together with Yu. B. Rumer, a Soviet physicist. The two monographs became the result of their joint work: "The Theory of Unitary Symmetry" (published in Moscow in 1970) and "The Theory of Groups and Quantum Fields" (Moscow, 1977), as well as a number of papers, including "Group Spin-(4) and the Periodic Table" ("Theoretical and Mathematical Physics", v. 9, 1971). This paper began group description of the system of chemical elements. In 1972, A.I. Fet was employed as a senior researcher at the theoretical physics laboratory of the Institute of Inorganic Chemistry thanks to its director A. V. Nikolayev. During the subsequent ten years, A.I. Fet developed the ideas of group classification of atoms in a number of publications, which by the beginning of the 1980s he summed up in his monograph "A Symmetry Group of Chemical Elements". As a result, the entire field of chemistry related to the Periodic Table became part of mathematical physics. In 1984, this monograph was prepared by the Siberian branch of the Nauka Publishing House for publication but suddenly the manuscript was withdrawn from print, and the type matter was decomposed. The reason why it was done became clear soon: on 8 October 1986 Fet was dismissed from work "due to noncompliance with the position held based on the performance evaluation." Again he continued to do science on his own, earning a living by casual translations.

According to Fet's philosophy, it is the man that is the end goal of any culture, a man with a harmonious personality, lofty ideals, and noble aspirations. And it is intelligentsia that has the mission of enlightening the society, though under conditions of harsh censorship.

Back in the 1960s, Fet took part in "Samizdat" publishing by translating books for Samizdat. Fet introduced the Russian reader to the main works by Konrad Lorenz, whose ideas made a significant impact on his own thinking: Civilized Man's Eight Deadly Sins (Die acht Todsünden der zivilisierten Menschheit, 1974), On Aggression (Das sogenannte Böse. Zur Naturgeschichte der Aggression, 1966), and Behind the Mirror, a Search for a Natural History of Human Knowledge (Die Rückseite des Spiegels. Versuch einer Naturgeschichte menschlichen Erkennens, 1973). Later those translations were published openly by Respublika Publishing House in Moscow (Behind the Mirror, and On Aggression, 1998); another edition was published in 2008 with Kulturnaya Revolutsia Publishing House (Moscow).

Fet was the first to translate and introduce many books on psychology for Samizdat which failed to pass the censorship in the USSR of the time: Eric Berne, Games People Play, 1964, The Layman's Guide to Psychiatry and Psychoanalysis, 1959, Sex in Human Loving, 1970; Erich Fromm Escape from Freedom (Die Furcht vor der Freiheit, 1941); Karen Horney, The Neurotic Personality of our Time, 1937, and many others.

To introduce the reader to various kinds of society organization, Fet translated books for Samizdat from the series of pocket ABC books published in Warsaw and disclosing the basics of social and economic organization in different countries: The ABC of Stockholm, The ABC of Vienna, The ABC of Bern. These translations were complemented by Fet's own articles: Social Doctrines (1979) and What is Socialism? (1989).

Beginning with the mid-1970s, Fet closely followed the events which took place in Poland. He perceived the Polish crisis of 1980−1981 as the start of collapse of the so-called Socialist camp. His book The Polish Revolution written in the wake of the events was anonymously published in 1985 in Paris and in London, with a foreword of Mario Corti. He provided an analysis of the Polish events, disclosed their historic prerequisites, demonstrated the outstanding role of the Polish intellectuals, and foretold the ways of further development for the country.

Fet wrote most of his humanitarian articles for Samizdat, as they could not appear in the censored Soviet periodicals. In the 1980s, the Russian emigree journal in Paris called Syntax published six articles by Fet signed with the pseudonym A.N. Klenov, which he later used for other writings on social issues.

Throughout his life, Fet was thinking on the human society, on the biological and cultural nature of man, on the social mission of the intelligentsia, on religious beliefs and ideals. These reflections resulted in his books Pythagoras and the Ape (1989), Letters from Russia (1989–1991), Delusions of Capitalism, or the Fatal Conceit of Professor Hayek (1996), the main work being Instinct and Social Behavior, published in 2009. This book is dedicated to the history of culture presented from the viewpoint of ethology. The author set a goal "to reveal the impact of the social instinct on the human society, to describe the conditions frustrating its manifestations and to explain the effects of various attempts to suppress this invincible instinct". Fet discovered and first described a kind of social instinct specific to humans, which he called "the instinct of intraspecific solidarity". Its specificity consists in the ability of being spread from minor groups to larger ones. Using comprehensive historic examples, the author has convincingly demonstrated how our morals and our love for our neighbors originated from tribal solidarity, which gradually became transformed into intraspecific solidarity, thus spreading the mark of kinship to ever wider communities, eventually to be referred to the entire mankind.

== Fet's works in mathematics ==
Fet's main areas of interest in mathematics are variational calculus and topology, including applications to geometry and calculus. The best known are Fet's classical theorems on closed geodesic arcs: The theorem of Lyusternik and Fet states that there exists at least one closed geodesic arc in any compact Riemann manifold. This result obtained by Lyusternik and Fet in 1951 was improved only in 1965, when Fet proved the theorem of two closed geodesic arcs. Fet's theorem states the existence of at least two non-recurrent closed geodesic arcs under the assumption that all closed geodesic arcs are non-degenerate. The result of 1965 has not yet been improved.

- Fet's works in mathematics.

== Fet's works in physics ==
Fet worked in the field of symmetry physics and the theory of elementary particles. Beginning with the early 1970s, he worked at physical substantiation of the system of chemical elements. He was the first to describe the logic of atomic weights previously considered unpredictable and developed the formula of atomic weight.

- Fet's works in physics.

Fet's works on social issues, philosophy, history, and his translations are available here in Russian.
