= Lobachevsky Prize =

Russian mathematics award

The Lobachevsky Prize, awarded by the Russian Academy of Sciences, and the Lobachevsky Medal, awarded by the Kazan State University, are mathematical awards in honor of Nikolai Ivanovich Lobachevsky.

== History ==
The Lobachevsky Prize was established in 1896 by the Kazan Physical and Mathematical Society, in honor of Russian mathematician Nikolai Ivanovich Lobachevsky, who had been a professor at Kazan University, where he spent nearly his entire mathematical career. The prize was first awarded in 1897. Between the October Revolution of 1917 and World War II the Lobachevsky Prize was awarded only twice, by the Kazan State University, in 1927 and 1937. In 1947, by a decree of the Council of Ministers of the USSR, the jurisdiction over awarding the Lobachevsky Prize was transferred to the USSR Academy of Sciences. The 1947 decree specified that there be two prizes, awarded every five years: the main, international, Lobachevsky Prize, for which both Soviet and foreign scientists would be eligible, and an honorable mention prize, for Soviet mathematicians only. In a 2003 article, B. N. Shapukov, a professor at the Kazan State University, writes that the 1947 decree also specified that awarding of the prize by the USSR Academy of Sciences should be done in consultation with the Kazan State University, but this condition was not subsequently followed in practice.

Another decree of the Council of Ministers of the USSR, in 1956, specified that there be only one, international, Lobachevsky Prize, to be awarded every three years.

With the dissolution of the Soviet Union at the end of 1991, the Russian Academy of Sciences became the legatee of the USSR Academy of Sciences. The Russian Academy of Sciences continued awarding the Lobachevsky Prize, awarding it in 1992, 1996 and 2000. As of January 2010, the Lobachevsky Prize is listed among its awards at the Russian Academy of Sciences website.

In 1990-1991, while preparing the 1992 celebration of Lobachevsky's 200th anniversary, the Kazan State University organizers of this celebration lobbied the Soviet government to establish a special Kazan State University award in honor of Lobachevsky. A June 1991 decree of the Cabinet of Ministers of the USSR established the Lobachevsky Medal, for outstanding contributions to geometry, to be awarded by the Kazan State University. The Lobachevsky Medal was awarded by the university in 1992, 1997 and 2002. The article of Shapukov mentions that during the 1997 competition for the Lobachevsky Medal, the Mathematics section of the Russian Academy of Sciences complained about the fact and the process of awarding the Medal. The Kazan State University website for the Lobachevsky Medal contains a list of recipients of the Lobachesky Prize from 1897 to 1989, which excludes the 1992, 1996 and 2000 Russian Academy of Sciences awards. The Russian Academy of Sciences website for the Lobachevsky Prize contains a list of recipients of the prize from 1897 to 2000 and does not mention Kazan State University's Lobachevsky Medal.

== Lobachevsky Prize winners ==
=== Kazan Physical and Mathematical Society/Kazan University ===
- 1897 - Sophus Lie
- 1900 - Wilhelm Killing
- 1903 - David Hilbert
- 1909 - Ludwig Schlesinger (awarded in 1912)
- 1912 - Friedrich Schur
- 1927 - Hermann Weyl
- 1937 - Élie Cartan (main, international, prize)
- 1937 - Viktor V. Wagner (special prize for young Soviet mathematicians)

In 1906, Beppo Levi received an honorable mention. The prize itself was not awarded.

=== Soviet Academy of Sciences ===
- 1951 - Nikolai Efimov
- 1951 - Aleksandr D. Alexandrov
- 1959 - Aleksei Pogorelov
- 1966 - Lev Pontryagin
- 1969 - Heinz Hopf
- 1972 - Pavel Alexandrov
- 1977 - Boris Delaunay
- 1980 - Sergei Novikov
- 1983 - Herbert Busemann
- 1986 - Andrey Kolmogorov
- 1989 - Friedrich Hirzebruch

=== Russian Academy of Sciences ===
- 1992 - Vladimir Arnold
- 1996 - Grigory Margulis
- 2000 - Yurii Reshetnyak

== Lobachevsky Medal winners ==
=== Kazan State University / Kazan Federal University ===
- 1992 - Aleksandr P. Norden
- 1997 - Boris P. Komrakov
- 1997 - Mikhail Gromov
- 2002 - Shiing-Shen Chern
- 2017 - Richard Schoen
- 2019 - Daniel Wise
- 2021 - Idzhad Sabitov
- 2023 - Yury Yershov
- 2025 - Sergey Ivanov

In 1997, Valery N. Berestovsky (Russia), Idjad Kh. Sabitov (Russia) and Boris Rosenfeld (USA) received an honorable mention.

== See also ==
- List of mathematics awards
