= Toponogov's theorem =

Triangle comparison theorem in Riemannian geometry

In the mathematical field of Riemannian geometry, Toponogov's theorem (named after Victor Andreevich Toponogov) is a triangle comparison theorem. It is one of a family of comparison theorems that quantify the assertion that a pair of geodesics emanating from a point p spread apart more slowly in a region of high curvature than they would in a region of low curvature.

Let M be an m-dimensional Riemannian manifold with sectional curvature K satisfying $K\ge \delta\,.$ Let pqr be a geodesic triangle, i.e. a triangle whose sides are geodesics, in M, such that the geodesic pq is minimal and if δ > 0, the length of the side pr is less than $\pi / \sqrt \delta$. Let p′q′r′ be a geodesic triangle in the model space M_{δ}, i.e. the simply connected space of constant curvature δ, such that the lengths of sides p′q′ and p′r′ are equal to that of pq and pr respectively and the angle at p′ is equal to that at p. Then

$$d(q,r) \le d(q',r').\,$$

When the sectional curvature is bounded from above, a corollary to the Rauch comparison theorem yields an analogous statement, but with the reverse inequality.
