= Hadamard manifold =

In mathematics, a Hadamard manifold, named after Jacques Hadamard — more often called a Cartan–Hadamard manifold, after Élie Cartan — is a Riemannian manifold $(M, g)$ that is complete and simply connected and has everywhere non-positive sectional curvature. By Cartan–Hadamard theorem all Cartan–Hadamard manifolds are diffeomorphic to the Euclidean space $\mathbb{R}^n.$ Furthermore it follows from the Hopf–Rinow theorem that every pairs of points in a Cartan–Hadamard manifold may be connected by a unique geodesic segment. Thus Cartan–Hadamard manifolds are some of the closest relatives of $\mathbb{R}^n.$

== Examples ==
The Euclidean space $\mathbb{R}^n$ with its usual metric is a Cartan–Hadamard manifold with constant sectional curvature equal to $0.$

Standard $n$-dimensional hyperbolic space $\mathbb{H}^n$ is a Cartan–Hadamard manifold with constant sectional curvature equal to $-1.$

== Properties ==
In Cartan-Hadamard manifolds, the map $\exp_p : \operatorname{T}M_p \to M$ is a diffeomorphism for all $p \in M.$

== See also ==
- Cartan–Hadamard conjecture
- Cartan–Hadamard theorem – On the structure of complete Riemannian manifolds of non-positive sectional curvature
- Hadamard space – Non-linear generalization of a Hilbert space
