= Cartan–Hadamard conjecture =

In mathematics, the Cartan–Hadamard conjecture is a fundamental problem in Riemannian geometry and geometric measure theory which states that the classical isoperimetric inequality may be generalized to spaces of nonpositive sectional curvature, known as Cartan–Hadamard manifolds. The conjecture, which is named after French mathematicians Élie Cartan and Jacques Hadamard, may be traced back to work of André Weil in 1926.

== History ==
The conjecture, in all dimensions, was first stated explicitly in 1976 by Thierry Aubin, and a few years later by Misha Gromov, Yuri Burago and Viktor Zalgaller. In dimension 2 this fact had already been established in 1926 by André Weil and rediscovered in 1933 by Beckenbach and Rado.

According to Marcel Berger, Weil, who was a student of Hadamard at the time, was prompted to work on this problem due to "a question asked during or after a Hadamard seminar at the Collège de France" by the probability theorist Paul Lévy.

In dimensions 3 and 4 the conjecture was proved by Bruce Kleiner in 1992, and Chris Croke in 1984 respectively. In 2026, Shibing Chen, Mohammad Ghomi, and Peng Wang posted a proof of the conjecture in dimension 5. In a subsequent paper they showed that their approach establishes the conjecture in dimensions up to at least 9.

Weil's proof relies on conformal maps and harmonic analysis, Croke's proof is based on an inequality of Santaló in integral geometry, while Kleiner adopts a variational approach which reduces the problem to an estimate for total curvature. Mohammad Ghomi and Joel Spruck have shown that Kleiner's approach will work in all dimensions where the total curvature inequality holds. The proof of Chen-Ghomi-Wang is based on a sharp estimate for the area of constant-mean-curvature hypersurfaces which gives a unified proof of the conjecture in all dimensions from 3 to 9.

In 2026 Mohammad Ghomi and John Stavroulakis proved the local version of the conjecture by showing that if the metric of the Euclidean ball is perturbed to one with nonpositive curvature then the Isoperimetric ratio will go up.

== Generalized form ==
The conjecture has a more general form, sometimes called the "generalized Cartan–Hadamard conjecture" which states that if the curvature of the ambient Cartan–Hadamard manifold M is bounded above by a nonpositive constant k, then the least perimeter enclosures in M, for any given volume, cannot have smaller perimeter than a sphere enclosing the same volume in the model space of constant curvature k.

The generalized conjecture has been established only in dimension 2 by Gerrit Bol, and dimension 3 by Kleiner.

== Applications ==
Immediate applications of the conjecture include extensions of the Sobolev inequality and Rayleigh–Faber–Krahn inequality to spaces of nonpositive curvature.
