= Viktor Reshetniak =

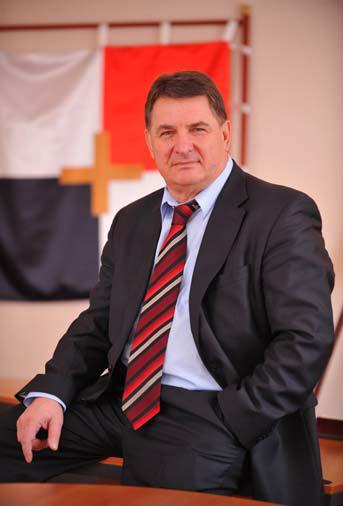
Viktor Reshetniak (2011)

Viktor Reshetnyak (18 February 1950 – 14 June 2015) was the Mayor of Vyshhorod, Ukraine.

== Biography ==
After finishing secondary school in Yevpatoria from 1965 to 1969 he was studying in Yevpatoria medical college and from 1969 to 1971 he was doing his military service in Soviet Army. During the period of 1971-1977 he was studying at medical department of Crimea National Medical Institute. Later on he entered the clinical studies in Kiev and after graduation he started working in Vyshhorod regional hospital as a Head of the hospital department. In 1986 he participated in liquidation of aftermath at Chernobyl Nuclear Power Station. From 1989 within 2 years he had been in business trip in Ethiopia as a doctor. In April, 2000 he defended his master’s dissertation and got the rank of The Candidate of Medical Sciences in obstetrics and gynaecology. He is the author of a number of scientific works.

In 2000 he underwent a training course on organizational and management work in the Central hospital in Sens (France).

From 2001 for the following 5 years he had been working as a Head Doctor of Vyshhorod District.

In 2002 he was elected as a Deputy of the Kyiv Regional Council. Since 2004 he has been the President of Dobrobut (Welfare) Charitable Fund and since 2005 he has been the Honoured President of Hippocrates Charitable Fund.

From April, 2006 until his death he was the Mayor of the town Vyshhorod.

== Honorary Degrees ==
- He was awarded with gold and silver medals of the Exhibition of Achievements of National Economy.
- He was awarded with numerous diplomas of Ministry of Public Health, Regional District State Administration and Regional Council.
- Has the rank of Honoured Doctor of Ukraine.
