= Sectional curvature =

Description in Riemannian geometry

In Riemannian geometry, the sectional curvature is one of the ways to describe the curvature of Riemannian manifolds. The sectional curvature $K(\sigma_p)$ depends on a two-dimensional linear subspace $\sigma_p$ of the tangent space at a point $p$ of the manifold. It can be defined geometrically as the Gaussian curvature of the surface which has the plane $\sigma_p$ as a tangent plane at $p$, obtained from geodesics which start at $p$ in the directions of $\sigma_p$ (in other words, the image of $\sigma_p$ under the exponential map at $p$). The sectional curvature is a real-valued function on the 2-Grassmannian bundle over the manifold.

The sectional curvature determines the Riemann curvature tensor completely.

== Definition ==
Given a Riemannian manifold and two linearly independent tangent vectors at the same point, u and v, we can define

$$K(u,v)={\langle R(u,v)v,u\rangle\over \langle u,u\rangle\langle v,v\rangle-\langle u,v\rangle^2}$$

Here R is the Riemann curvature tensor, defined here by the convention $R(u,v)w=\nabla_u\nabla_vw-\nabla_v\nabla_uw-\nabla_{[u,v]}w$. Some sources use the opposite convention $R(u,v)w=\nabla_v\nabla_uw-\nabla_u\nabla_vw-\nabla_{[v,u]}w$, in which case $K(u,v)$ must be defined with $\langle R(u,v)u,v\rangle$ in the numerator instead of $\langle R(u,v)v,u\rangle.$

Note that the linear independence of u and v forces the denominator in the above expression to be nonzero, so that K(u, v) is well-defined. In particular, if u and v are orthonormal, then the definition takes on the simple form

$$K(u,v) = \langle R(u,v)v,u\rangle.$$

It is straightforward to check that if $u,v\in T_pM$ are linearly independent and span the same two-dimensional linear subspace of the tangent space $T_pM$ as $x,y\in T_pM$, then $K(u,v)=K(x,y)$. So one may consider the sectional curvature as a real-valued function whose input is a two-dimensional linear subspace of a tangent space.

=== Alternative definitions ===
Alternatively, the sectional curvature can be characterized by the circumference of small circles. Let $P$ be a two-dimensional plane in $T_xM$. Let $C_P(r)$ for sufficiently small $r > 0$ denote the image under the exponential map at $p$ of the unit circle in $P$, and let $l_P(r)$ denote the length of $C_P(r)$. Then it can be proven that

$$l_P(r)=2\pi r \left(1-{r^2\over 6}\sigma(P)+O(r^3)\right),$$

as $r \to 0$, for some number $\sigma(P)$. This number $\sigma(P)$ at $p$ is the sectional curvature of $P$ at $p$.

== Manifolds with constant sectional curvature ==
One says that a Riemannian manifold has "constant curvature $\kappa$" if $\operatorname{sec}(P)=\kappa$ for all two-dimensional linear subspaces $P\subset T_pM$ and for all $p\in M$.

The Schur lemma states that if (M, g) is a connected Riemannian manifold with dimension at least three, and if there is a function $f:M\to\mathbb{R}$ such that $\operatorname{sec}(P)=f(p)$ for all two-dimensional linear subspaces $P\subset T_pM$ and for all $p\in M$, then f must be constant and hence (M, g) has constant curvature.

A Riemannian manifold with constant sectional curvature is called a space form. If $\kappa$ denotes the constant value of the sectional curvature, then the curvature tensor can be written as

$$R(u,v)w=\kappa \big(\langle v,w\rangle u-\langle u,w\rangle v\big)$$

for any $u,v,w\in T_pM$.

Proof
Briefly: one polarization argument gives a formula for $R(u,v)v,$ a second (equivalent) polarization argument gives a formula for $R(u,v)w+R(u,w)v,$ and a combination with the first Bianchi identity recovers the given formula for $R(u,v)w.$

From the definition of sectional curvature, we know that $\langle R(u, v)v, u\rangle = \kappa\left(|u|^2|v|^2 - \langle u, v \rangle^2\right)$ whenever $u,v$ are linearly independent, and this easily extends to the case that $u,v$ are linearly dependent since both sides are then zero. Now, given arbitrary u,v,w, compute $\langle R(u+w,v)v,u+w\rangle$ in two ways. First, according to the above formula, it equals

$$\kappa\left(|v|^2\left(|u|^2 + |w|^2 + 2\langle u, w \rangle\right) - \langle u, v \rangle^2 - \langle w, v \rangle^2 - 2\langle u, v \rangle\langle w, v \rangle\right).$$

Secondly, by multilinearity, it equals $\langle R(u,v)v,u\rangle+\langle R(w,v)v,w\rangle+\langle R(u,v)v,w\rangle+\langle R(w,v)v,u\rangle,$

which, recalling the Riemannian symmetry $\langle R(u,v)v,w\rangle=\langle R(w,v)v,u\rangle,$ can be simplified to

$$\kappa\Big(|u|^2|v|^2-\langle u,v\rangle^2\Big)+\kappa\Big(|w|^2|v|^2-\langle w,v\rangle^2\Big)+2\langle R(u,v)v,w\rangle.$$

Setting these two computations equal to each other and canceling terms, one finds

$$\langle R(u,v)v,w\rangle = \kappa\Big(|v|^2\langle u,w\rangle - \langle u,v\rangle\langle w,v\rangle\Big).$$

Since w is arbitrary this shows that

$$R(u,v)v=\kappa\Big(|v|^2u-\langle u,v\rangle v\Big)$$

for any u,v. Now let u,v,w be arbitrary and compute $R(u,v+w)(v+w)$ in two ways. Firstly, by this new formula, it equals

$$\kappa\left(\left(|v|^2 + |w|^2 + 2\langle v, w \rangle\right)u - \langle u, v \rangle v - \langle u, w \rangle v - \langle u, v \rangle w - \langle u, w \rangle w\right).$$

Secondly, by multilinearity, it equals $R(u,v)v+R(u,w)w+R(u,v)w+R(u,w)v$ which by the new formula equals

$$\kappa\left(|v|^2u - \langle u, v \rangle v\right) + \kappa\left(|w|^2u - \langle u, w \rangle w\right) + R(u, v)w + R(u, w)v.$$

Setting these two computations equal to each other shows

$$R(u, v)w + R(u, w)v = \kappa\left(2\langle v, w \rangle u - \langle u, w \rangle v - \langle u, v \rangle w\right).$$

Swap $u$ and $v$, then add this to the Bianchi identity $R(v, u)w + R(u, w)v + R(w, v)u = 0$ to get

$$2R(v, u)w + R(u, w)v = \kappa\left(2\langle u, w \rangle v - \langle v, w \rangle u - \langle u, v \rangle w\right).$$

Subtract these two equations, making use of the symmetry $R(u, v)w = -R(v, u)w,$ to get

$$3R(u, v)w = 3\kappa\left(\langle v, w \rangle u - \langle u, w \rangle v\right).$$

Since any Riemannian metric is parallel with respect to its Levi-Civita connection, this shows that the Riemann tensor of any constant-curvature space is also parallel. The Ricci tensor is then given by $\operatorname{Ric} = (n - 1)\kappa g$ and the scalar curvature is $n(n - 1)\kappa.$ In particular, any constant-curvature space is Einstein and has constant scalar curvature.

=== Model examples ===
Given a positive number $a,$ define

- $\left(\mathbb{R}^n, g_{\mathbb{R}^n}\right)$ to be the standard Riemannian structure
- $\left(S^n(a), g_{S^n(a)}\right)$ to be the sphere $S^n(a) \equiv \left\{x\in\mathbb{R}^{n+1}: |x| = a\right\}$ with $g_{S^n(a)}$ given by the pullback of the standard Riemannian structure on $\mathbb{R}^{n+1}$ by the inclusion map $S^n(a) \to \mathbb{R}^{n+1}$
- $\left(H^n(a), g_{H^n(a)}\right)$ to be the ball $H^n(a) \equiv \left\{x\in\mathbb{R}^n: |x| < a\right\}$ with $g_{H^n(a)} = a^2\frac{\bigl(a^2 - |x|{}^2\bigr)\left(dx_1^2 + \cdots + dx_n^2\right) - \left(x_1 dx_1 + \cdots + x_n dx_n\right)^2}{\bigl(a^2 - |x|{}^2\bigr)^2}.$

In the usual terminology, these Riemannian manifolds are referred to as Euclidean space, the n-sphere, and hyperbolic space. Here, the point is that each is a complete connected smooth Riemannian manifold with constant curvature. To be precise, the Riemannian metric $g_{\mathbb{R}^n}$ has constant curvature 0, the Riemannian metric $g_{S^n(a)}$ has constant curvature $1/a^2$, and the Riemannian metric $g_{H^n(a)}$ has constant curvature $-1/a^2$.

Furthermore, these are the 'universal' examples in the sense that if $(M, g)$ is a smooth, connected, and simply-connected complete Riemannian manifold with constant curvature, then it is isometric to one of the above examples; the particular example is dictated by the value of the constant curvature of $g,$ according to the constant curvatures of the above examples.

If $(M, g)$ is a smooth and connected complete Riemannian manifold with constant curvature, but is not assumed to be simply-connected, then consider the universal covering space $\pi:\widetilde{M}\to M$ with the pullback Riemannian metric $\pi^\ast g$. Since $\pi$ is, by topological principles, a covering map, the Riemannian manifold $(\widetilde{M},\pi^\ast g)$ is locally isometric to $(M,g)$, and so it is a smooth, connected, and simply-connected complete Riemannian manifold with the same constant curvature as $g$. It must then be isometric one of the above model examples. Note that the deck transformations of the universal cover are isometries relative to the metric $\pi^\ast g$.

The study of Riemannian manifolds with constant negative curvature is called hyperbolic geometry.

== Scaling ==
Let $(M, g)$ be a smooth manifold, and let $\lambda$ be a positive number. Consider the Riemannian manifold $(M, \lambda g)$. The curvature tensor, as a multilinear map $T_pM\times T_pM\times T_pM\to T_pM,$ is unchanged by this modification. Let $v,w$ be linearly independent vectors in $T_pM$. Then

$$K_{\lambda g}(v, w) = \frac{\lambda g\left(R^{\lambda g}(v, w)w, v\right)}{|v|_{\lambda g}^2|w|_{\lambda g}^2 - \langle v, w \rangle\vphantom|_{\lambda g}^2} = \frac{1}{\lambda}\frac{g\left(R^g(v, w)w, v\right)}{|v|_g^2|w|_g^2 - \langle v, w \rangle\vphantom|_g^2} = \frac{1}{\lambda}K_g(v,w).$$

So multiplication of the metric by $\lambda$ multiplies all of the sectional curvatures by $\lambda^{-1}$.

== Toponogov's theorem ==
Toponogov's theorem affords a characterization of sectional curvature in terms of how "fat" geodesic triangles appear when compared to their Euclidean counterparts. The basic intuition is that, if a space is positively curved, then the edge of a triangle opposite some given vertex will tend to bend away from that vertex, whereas if a space is negatively curved, then the opposite edge of the triangle will tend to bend towards the vertex.

More precisely, let M be a complete Riemannian manifold, and let xyz be a geodesic triangle in M (a triangle each of whose sides is a length-minimizing geodesic). Finally, let m be the midpoint of the geodesic xy. If M has non-negative curvature, then for all sufficiently small triangles

$$d(z,m)^2 \ge \tfrac12 d(z,x)^2 + \tfrac12 d(z,y)^2 - \tfrac14 d(x,y)^2$$

where d is the distance function on M. The case of equality holds precisely when the curvature of M vanishes, and the right-hand side represents the distance from a vertex to the opposite side of a geodesic triangle in Euclidean space having the same side-lengths as the triangle xyz. This makes precise the sense in which triangles are "fatter" in positively curved spaces. In non-positively curved spaces, the inequality goes the other way:

$$d(z,m)^2 \le \tfrac12 d(z,x)^2 + \tfrac12 d(z,y)^2 - \tfrac14 d(x,y)^2.$$

If tighter bounds on the sectional curvature are known, then this property generalizes to give a comparison theorem between geodesic triangles in M and those in a suitable simply connected space form; see Toponogov's theorem. Simple consequences of the version stated here are:

- A complete Riemannian manifold has non-negative sectional curvature if and only if the function $f_p(x) = \operatorname{dist}^2(p,x)$ is 1-concave for all points p.
- A complete simply connected Riemannian manifold has non-positive sectional curvature if and only if the function $f_p(x) = \operatorname{dist}^2(p,x)$ is 1-convex.

== Manifolds with non-positive sectional curvature ==
In 1928, Élie Cartan proved the Cartan–Hadamard theorem: if M is a complete manifold with non-positive sectional curvature, then its universal cover is diffeomorphic to a Euclidean space. In particular, it is aspherical: the homotopy groups $\pi_i(M)$ for i ≥ 2 are trivial. Therefore, the topological structure of a complete non-positively curved manifold is determined by its fundamental group. Preissman's theorem restricts the fundamental group of negatively curved compact manifolds. The Cartan–Hadamard conjecture states that the classical isoperimetric inequality should hold in all simply connected spaces of non-positive curvature, which are called Cartan–Hadamard manifolds.

== Manifolds with positive sectional curvature ==
Little is known about the structure of positively curved manifolds. The soul theorem (Cheeger & Gromoll 1972; Gromoll & Meyer 1969) implies that a complete non-compact non-negatively curved manifold is diffeomorphic to a normal bundle over a compact non-negatively curved manifold. As for compact positively curved manifolds, there are two classical results:

- It follows from the Myers theorem that the fundamental group of such a manifold is finite.
- It follows from the Synge theorem that the fundamental group of such a manifold in even dimensions is 0, if orientable and $\mathbb Z_2$ otherwise. In odd dimensions a positively curved manifold is always orientable.

Moreover, there are relatively few examples of compact positively curved manifolds, leaving a lot of conjectures (e.g., the Hopf conjecture on whether there is a metric of positive sectional curvature on $\mathbb S^2 \times \mathbb S^2$). The most typical way of constructing new examples is the following corollary from the O'Neill curvature formulas: if $(M, g)$ is a Riemannian manifold admitting a free isometric action of a Lie group G, and M has positive sectional curvature on all 2-planes orthogonal to the orbits of G, then the manifold $M/G$ with the quotient metric has positive sectional curvature. This fact allows one to construct the classical positively curved spaces, being spheres and projective spaces, as well as these examples (Ziller 2007):

- The Berger spaces $B^7=\operatorname{SO}(5)/\operatorname{SO}(3)$ and $B^{13}=\operatorname{SU}(5)/\operatorname{Sp}(2) \cdot \mathbb S^1$.
- The Wallach spaces (or the homogeneous flag manifolds): $W^6=\operatorname{SU}(3)/T^2$, $W^{12}=\operatorname{Sp}(3)/\operatorname{Sp}(1)^3$ and $W^{24}=F_4/\operatorname{Spin}(8)$.
- The Aloff–Wallach spaces $W^7_{p,q} = \operatorname{SU}(3)/\operatorname{diag}\left(z^p, z^q, \overline{z}^{p+q}\right)$.
- The Eschenburg spaces $E_{k,l} = \operatorname{diag}\left(z^{k_1}, z^{k_2}, z^{k_3}\right)\backslash \operatorname{SU}(3)/\operatorname{diag}\left(z^{l_1}, z^{l_2}, z^{l_3}\right)^{-1}.$
- The Bazaikin spaces $B^{13}_p = \operatorname{diag}\left(z_1^{p_1}, \dots, z_1^{p_5}\right)\backslash \operatorname{U}(5)/\operatorname{diag}(z_2 A, 1)^{-1}$, where $A\in \operatorname{Sp}(2)\subset \operatorname{SU}(4)$.

== Manifolds with non-negative sectional curvature ==
Cheeger and Gromoll proved their soul theorem which states that any non-negatively curved complete non-compact manifold $M$ has a totally convex compact submanifold $S$ such that $M$ is diffeomorphic to the normal bundle of $S$. Such an $S$ is called the soul of $M$. In particular, this theorem implies that $M$ is homotopic to its soul $S$ which has the dimension less than $M$.

== See also ==
- Riemann curvature tensor
- Curvature of Riemannian manifolds
- Curvature
- Holomorphic sectional curvature
