= Douady–Earle extension =

In mathematics, the Douady–Earle extension, named after Adrien Douady and Clifford Earle, is a way of extending homeomorphisms of the unit circle in the complex plane to homeomorphisms of the closed unit disk, such that the extension is a diffeomorphism of the open disk. The extension is analytic on the open disk. The extension has an important equivariance property: if the homeomorphism is composed on either side with a Möbius transformation preserving the unit circle the extension is also obtained by composition with the same Möbius transformation. If the homeomorphism is quasisymmetric, the diffeomorphism is quasiconformal. An extension for quasisymmetric homeomorphisms had previously been given by Lars Ahlfors and Arne Beurling; a different equivariant construction had been given in 1985 by Pekka Tukia. Equivariant extensions have important applications in Teichmüller theory; for example, they lead to a quick proof of the contractibility of the Teichmüller space of a Fuchsian group.

== Definition ==
By the Radó–Kneser–Choquet theorem, the Poisson integral

$$F_f(re^{i\theta}) ={1\over 2\pi} \int_0^{2\pi} f(\varphi)\cdot {1- r^2\over 1 - 2r\cos (\theta -\varphi) + r^2}\,d\varphi,$$

of a homeomorphism f of the circle defines a harmonic diffeomorphism of the unit disk extending f. If f is quasisymmetric, the extension is not necessarily quasiconformal, i.e. the complex dilatation

$$\mu(z)={\partial_{\overline{z}}F_f\over \partial_z F_f},$$

does not necessarily satisfy

$$\sup_{|z|<1} |\mu(z)| < 1.$$

However F can be used to define another analytic extension H_{f} of f^{−1} which does satisfy this condition. It follows that

$$E(f)=H_{f^{-1}}$$

is the required extension.

For |a| < 1 define the Möbius transformation

$$g_a(z)= {z-a\over 1- \overline{a}z}.$$

It preserves the unit circle and unit disk sending a to 0.

If g is any Möbius transformation preserving the unit circle and disk, then

$$F_{f\circ g} = F_f\circ g.$$

For |a| < 1 define

$$w=H_f(a)$$

to be the unique w with |w| < 1 and

$$F_{g_a\circ f}(w) =0.$$

For |a| =1 set

$$H_f(a)=f^{-1}(a).$$

== Properties ==
- Compatibility with Möbius transformations. By construction

$$H_{g\circ f \circ h} = h^{-1}\circ H_f \circ g^{-1}$$

for any Möbius transformations g and h preserving the unit circle and disk.

- Functional equation. If |a|, |b| < 1 and

$$\Phi(a,b)={1\over 2\pi} \int_0^{2\pi} \left( {f(e^{i\theta}) -b\over 1-\overline{b}f(e^{i\theta})} \right) {1-|a|^2\over |a-e^{i\theta}|^2}\, d\theta ,$$

then $\Phi(a,b) =0 .$

- Continuity. If |a|, |b| < 1, define

$$\Phi(a,b)= F_{g_a\circ f}(b)={1\over 2\pi} \int_0^{2\pi} g_a\circ f\circ g_{-b} (e^{i\theta})\, d\theta = {1\over 2\pi} \int_0^{2\pi} \left( {f(e^{i\theta}) -b\over 1-\overline{b} f(e^{i\theta})} \right) {1-|a|^2\over |a-e^{i\theta}|^2} \, d\theta$$

If z_{n} and w_{n} lie in the unit disk and tend to z and w and homeomorphisms of the circle are defined by

$$f_n=g_{z_n}\circ f \circ g_{-w_n},$$

then f_{n} tends almost everywhere to

- g_{z} $\circ$ f $\circ$ g_{−w} if |z|, |w| < 1;
- g_{z} $\circ$ f (w) if |z| < 1 and |w| = 1;
- −z if |z| = 1 and |w| ≤ 1 with w ≠ f^{−1}(z).

By the dominated convergence theorem, it follows that Φ(z_{n},w_{n}) has a non-zero limit if w ≠ H_{f}(z). This implies that H_{f} is continuous on the closed unit disk. Indeed otherwise, by compactness, there would be a sequence z_{n} tending to z in the closed disk, with w_{n} = H_{f}(z_{n}) tending to a limit w ≠ H_{f}(z). But then Φ(z_{n},w_{n}) = 0 so has limit zero, a contradiction, since w ≠ H_{f}(z).

- Smoothness and non-vanishing Jacobian on open disk. H_{f} is smooth with nowhere vanishing Jacobian on |z| < 1. In fact, because of the compatibility with Möbius transformations, it suffices to check that H_{f} is smooth near 0 and has non-vanishing derivative at 0.

If f has Fourier series

$$f(e^{i\theta}) = \sum_m a_m e^{im\theta},$$

then the derivatives of F_{f} at 0 are given by

$$\partial_z F_f (0)= a_1,\qquad \partial_{\overline{z}} F_f(0) =a_{-1}.$$

Thus the Jacobian of F_{f} at 0 is given by

$$|\partial_z F_f(0)|^2 - |\partial_{\overline{z}} F_f(0)|^2 = |a_1|^2 - |a_{-1}|^2.$$

Since F_{f} is an orientation-preserving diffeomorphism, its Jacobian is positive:

$$|a_{1}|^2 - |a_{-1}|^2 >0.$$

The function Φ(z,w) is analytic and so smooth. Its derivatives at (0,0) are given by

$$\Phi_z(0,0)=a_{-1},\quad \Phi_{\overline{z}}(0,0)=a_{1},\quad \Phi_w(0,0) = -1,\quad \Phi_{\overline{w}}(0,0) = {1\over 2\pi} \int_0^{2\pi} f(e^{i\theta})^2\, d\theta=b.$$

Direct calculation shows that

$$|\Phi_{w}(0,0)|^2 - |\Phi_{\overline{w}}(0,0)|^2=1-\left|{1\over 2\pi}\int_0^{2\pi} f(e^{i\theta})^2 \, d\theta\right|^2 \ge 0.$$

by the Cauchy–Schwarz inequality. If the right hand side vanished, then equality would occur in the Cauchy-Schwarz inequality forcing

$$f(e^{i\theta}) =\zeta \overline{f(e^{i\theta})}$$

for some ζ in T and for all θ, a contradiction since f assumes all values in T. The left hand side is therefore strictly positive and |b| < 1.

Consequently the implicit function theorem can be applied. It implies that H_{f}(z) is smooth near o. Its Jacobian can be computed by implicit differentiation:

$$|\partial_z H_f(0)|^2 - |\partial_{\overline{z}}H_f(0)|^2 = {|\Phi_z(0,0)|^2 - |\Phi_{\overline{z}}(0,0)|^2 \over |\Phi_w(0,0)|^2 -|\Phi_{\overline{w}}(0,0)|^2} >0.$$

Moreover

$${\partial_{\overline{z}}H_f (0)\over \partial_z H_f(0)}=g_b\left(-{a_{-1}\over \overline{a}_1}\right).$$

- Homeomorphism on closed disk and diffeomorphism on open disk. It is enough to show that H_{f} is a homeomorphism. By continuity its image is compact so closed. The non-vanishing of the Jacobian, implies that H_{f} is an open mapping on the unit disk, so that the image of the open disk is open. Hence the image of the closed disk is an open and closed subset of the closed disk. By connectivity, it must be the whole disk. For |w| < 1, the inverse image of w is closed, so compact, and entirely contained in the open disk. Since H_{f} is locally a homeomorphism, it must be a finite set. The set of points w in the open disk with exactly n preimages is open. By connectivity every point has the same number N of preimages. Since the open disk is simply connected, N = 1. (In fact taking any preimage of the origin, every radial line has a unique lifting to a preimage, and so there is an open subset of the unit disk mapping homeomorphically onto the open disc. If N > 1, its complement would also have to be open, contradicting connectivity.)

== Extension of quasi-Möbius homeomorphisms ==
In this section it is established that the extension of a quasisymmetric homeomorphism is quasiconformal. Fundamental use is made of the notion of quasi-Möbius homeomorphism.

A homeomorphism f of the circle is quasisymmetric if there are constants a, b > 0 such that

$${|f(z_1)-f(z_2)|\over |f(z_1)-f(z_3)|} \le a {|z_1-z_2|^b\over |z_1-z_3|^b}.$$

It is quasi-Möbius is there are constants c, d > 0 such that

$$|(f(z_1),f(z_2);f(z_3),f(z_4))| \le c |(z_1,z_2;z_3,z_4)|^d,$$

where

$$(z_1,z_2;z_3,z_4)={(z_1-z_3)(z_2-z_4)\over(z_2-z_3)(z_1-z_4)}$$

denotes the cross-ratio.

If f is quasisymmetric then it is also quasi-Möbius, with c = a^{2} and d = b: this follows by multiplying the first inequality for (z_{1},z_{3},z_{4}) and (z_{2},z_{4},z_{3}).

It is immediate that the quasi-Möbius homeomorphisms are closed under the operations of inversion and composition.

The complex dilatation μ of a diffeomorphism F of the unit disk is defined by

$$\mu_F(z)={\partial_{\overline{z}}F(z)\over \partial_z F(z)}.$$

If F and G are diffeomorphisms of the disk, then

$$\mu_{G\circ F^{-1}}\circ F={F_z\over \overline{F}_z} {\mu_G-\mu_F\over 1 -\overline{\mu}_F\mu_G}.$$

In particular if G is holomorphic, then

$$\mu_{F\circ G^{-1}} \circ G = {G_z\over \overline{G}_z} \mu_F,\,\,\, \mu_{G^{-1}\circ F}=\mu_F.$$

When F = H_{f},

$$\mu_F(0)=g_b\left( -{a_{-1}\over \overline{a}_1}\right),$$

where

$$a_{\pm 1}={1\over 2\pi} \int_0^{2\pi} f(e^{i\theta})e^{\mp i\theta} \, d\theta,\qquad b={1\over 2\pi} \int_0^{2\pi} f(e^{i\theta})^2 \, d\theta.$$

To prove that F = H_{f} is quasiconformal amounts to showing that

$$\|\mu_F\|_\infty < 1.$$

Since f is a quasi-Möbius homeomorphism the compositions g_{1} $\circ$ f $\circ$ g_{2} with g_{i} Möbius transformations satisfy exactly the same estimates, since Möbius transformations preserve the cross ratio. So to prove that H_{f} is quasiconformal it suffices to show that if f is any quasi-Möbius homeomorphism fixing 1, i and −i, with fixed c and d, then the quantities

$$\Lambda(f)=\left|g_b\left( -{a_{-1}\over \overline{a}_1}\right)\right|$$

have an upper bound strictly less than one.

On the other hand, if f is quasi-Möbius and fixes 1, i and −i, then f satisfies a Hölder continuity condition:

$$|f(z)-f(w)|\le C |z-w|^d,$$

for another positive constant C independent of f. The same is true for the f^{−1}'s. But then the Arzelà–Ascoli theorem implies these homeomorphisms form a compact subset in C(T). The non-linear functional Λ is continuous on this subset and therefore attains its upper bound at some f_{0}. On the other hand, Λ(f_{0}) < 1, so the upper bound is strictly less than 1.

The uniform Hölder estimate for f is established in Väisälä (1984) as follows. Take z, w in T.

- If |z − 1| ≤ 1/4 and |z − w| ≤ 1/8, then |z ± i| ≥ 1/4 and |w ± i| ≥ 1/8. But then

$$|(w,i; z,-i)| \le 16|z-w|,\,\,\, |(f(w),i; f(z),-i)| \ge  |f(z)-f(w)|/8,$$

so there is a corresponding Hölder estimate.

- If |z − w| ≥ 1/8, the Hölder estimate is trivial since |f(z) − f(w)| ≤ 2.
- If |z − 1| ≥ 1/4, then |w − ζ| ≥ 1/4 for ζ = i or −i. But then

$$|(z,\zeta;w,1)| \le 8|z-w|,\qquad |(f(z),\zeta; f(w),1)|\ge  |f(z)-f(w)|/8,$$

so there is a corresponding Hölder estimate.

Comment. In fact every quasi-Möbius homeomorphism f is also quasisymmetric. This follows using the Douady–Earle extension, since every quasiconformal homeomorphism of the unit disk induces a quasisymmetric homeomorphism of the unit circle. It can also be proved directly, following Väisälä (1984)

Indeed it is immediate that if f is quasi-Möbius so is its inverse. It then follows that f (and hence f^{–1}) is Hölder continuous. To see this, let S be the set of cube roots of unity, so that if a ≠ b in S, then |a − b| = 2 sin π/3 = √3. To prove a Hölder estimate, it can be assumed that x – y is uniformly small. Then both x and y are greater than a fixed distance away from a, b in S with a ≠ b, so the estimate follows by applying the quasi-Möbius inequality to x, a, y, b. To check that f is quasisymmetric, it suffices to find a uniform upper bound for |f(x) − f(y)| / |f(x) − f(z)| in the case of a triple with |x − z| = |x − y|, uniformly small. In this case there is a point w at a distance greater than 1 from x, y and z. Applying the quasi-Möbius inequality to x, w, y and z yields the required upper bound.
