= Quasisymmetric map =

In mathematics, a quasisymmetric homeomorphism between metric spaces is a map that generalizes bi-Lipschitz maps. While bi-Lipschitz maps shrink or expand the diameter of a set by no more than a multiplicative factor, quasisymmetric maps satisfy the weaker geometric property that they preserve the relative sizes of sets: if two sets A and B have diameters t and are no more than distance t apart, then the ratio of their sizes changes by no more than a multiplicative constant. These maps are also related to quasiconformal maps, since in many circumstances they are in fact equivalent.

== Definition ==
Let $(X,d_X)$ and $(Y,d_Y)$ be two metric spaces. A homeomorphism $f\colon X\to Y$ is said to be η-quasisymmetric for some increasing function $\eta:[0,+\infty) \to [0,+\infty)$ if for any triple $x,y,z$ of distinct points in $X$, we have:

$\frac{d_Y(f(x),f(y))}{d_{Y}(f(x),f(z))} \leq \eta\left(\frac{d_X(x,y)}{d_X(x,z)}\right).$

== Basic properties ==
Inverses are quasisymmetric
If $f\colon X\to Y$ is an invertible η-quasisymmetric map as above, then its inverse map is $\eta'$-quasisymmetric, where $\eta'(t) = 1/\eta^{-1}(1/t).$
Quasisymmetric maps preserve relative sizes of sets
If $A$ and $B$ are subsets of $X$ and $A$ is a subset of $B$, then

$$\frac{1}{2}\eta^{-1}\left(\frac{\operatorname{diam} B}{\operatorname{diam} A}\right)\leq \frac{\operatorname{diam}f(B)}{\operatorname{diam}f(A)}\leq 2\eta\left(\frac{\operatorname{diam} B}{\operatorname{diam}A}\right).$$

== Examples ==
=== Weakly quasisymmetric maps ===
A map $f\colon X\to Y$ is said to be H-weakly-quasisymmetric for some $H>0$ if for all triples of distinct points $x,y,z$ in $X$, then
$$|f(x)-f(y)|\leq H|f(x)-f(z)|\;\;\;\text{ whenever }\;\;\; |x-y|\leq |x-z|$$

Not all weakly quasisymmetric maps are quasisymmetric. However, if $X$ is connected and $X$ and $Y$ are doubling, then all weakly quasisymmetric maps are quasisymmetric. The appeal of this result is that proving weak-quasisymmetry is much easier than proving quasisymmetry directly, and in many natural settings the two notions are equivalent.

=== δ-monotone maps ===
A monotone map $f\colon H\to H$ on a Hilbert space $H$ is δ-monotone if for all $x,y$ in $H$,
$$\langle f(x)-f(y),x-y\rangle\geq \delta |f(x)-f(y)|\cdot|x-y|.$$

To grasp what this condition means geometrically, suppose $f(0)=0$ and consider the above estimate when $y=0$. Then it implies that the angle between the vector $x$ and its image $f(x)$ stays between 0 and $\arccos(\delta)<\pi/2$.

These maps are quasisymmetric, although they are a much narrower subclass of quasisymmetric maps. For example, while a general quasisymmetric map in the complex plane could map the real line to a set of Hausdorff dimension strictly greater than one, a δ-monotone will always map the real line to a rotated graph of a Lipschitz function $L:\mathbb{R} \rarr \mathbb{R}$.

== Doubling measures ==
=== The real line ===
Quasisymmetric homeomorphisms of the real line to itself can be characterized in terms of their derivatives. An increasing homeomorphism $f:\mathbb{R} \rarr \mathbb{R}$ is quasisymmetric if and only if there is a constant $C>0$ and a doubling measure μ on the real line such that

$$f(x)=C+\int_0^x \, d\mu(t).$$

=== Euclidean space ===
An analogous result holds in Euclidean space. Suppose $C=0$ and we rewrite the above equation for $f$ as
$$f(x) = \frac{1}{2}\int_{\mathbb{R}}\left(\frac{x-t}{|x-t|}+\frac{t}{|t|}\right)d\mu(t).$$

Writing it this way, we can attempt to define a map using this same integral, but instead integrate (what is now a vector valued integrand) over $\mathbb{R}^n$: if μ is a doubling measure on $\mathbb{R}^n$ and
$$\int_{|x|>1}\frac{1}{|x|}\,d\mu(x)<\infty$$
then the map
$$f(x) = \frac{1}{2}\int_{\mathbb{R}^{n}}\left(\frac{x-y}{|x-y|}+\frac{y}{|y|}\right)\,d\mu(y)$$
is quasisymmetric (in fact, it is δ-monotone for some δ depending on the measure μ).

== Quasisymmetry and quasiconformality in Euclidean space ==
Let $\Omega$ and $\Omega'$ be open subsets of $\mathbb{R}^n$. If $f\colon \Omega\to\Omega'$ is η-quasisymmetric, then it is also K-quasiconformal, where $K>0$ is a constant depending on $\eta$.

Conversely, if $f\colon \Omega\to\Omega'$ is K-quasiconformal and $B(x,2r)$ is contained in $\Omega$, then $f$ is η-quasisymmetric on $B(x,2r)$, where $\eta$ depends only on $K$.

== Quasi-Möbius maps ==
A related but weaker condition is the notion of quasi-Möbius maps where instead of the ratio only the cross-ratio is considered:

=== Definition ===
Let $(X,d_X)$ and $(Y,d_Y)$ be two metric spaces and let $\eta:[0,+\infty) \to [0,+\infty)$ be an increasing function. An η-quasi-Möbius homeomorphism $f\colon X\to Y$ is a homeomorphism such that for every quadruple $x,y,z,t$ of distinct points in $X$, we have

$$\frac{d_Y(f(x),f(z))d_Y(f(y),f(t))}{d_Y(f(x),f(y))d_Y(f(z),f(t))} \leq \eta\left(\frac{d_X(x,z)d_X(y,t)}{d_X(x,y)d_X(z,t)}\right).$$

== See also ==
- Douady–Earle extension
