= Yurii Reshetnyak =

Russian mathematician (1929–2021)

- Юрий Решетняк
- Born: 26 September 1929; Leningrad, RSFSR, USSR
- Died: 17 December 2021 (aged 92); Novosibirsk, Russia
- Citizenship: USSR, Russia
- Education: Leningrad State University
- Scientific career
- Fields: Mathematics
- Doctoral advisor: A. D. Aleksandrov

Yurii Grigorievich Reshetnyak (Russian: Ю́рий Григо́рьевич Решетня́к, 26 September 1929 – 17 December 2021) was a Soviet and Russian mathematician and academician.

He worked in geometry and the theory of functions of a real variable. He was known for his work in the Reshetnyak gluing theorem. Reshetnyak received the 2000 Lobachevsky Prize from the Russian Academy of Sciences.

Reshetnyak died on 17 December 2021, at the age of 92.

== Selected publications ==
- Space mappings with bounded distortion. Translations of Mathematical Monographs. Vol. 73. Providence, RI: American Mathematical Society. 1989. ISBN 0-8218-4526-8; 362 pp.
- with A. D. Aleksandrov: General theory of irregular curves [translated from the Russian by L. Ya. Yuzina]. Dordrecht & Boston: Kluwer Academic Publishers. 1989. ISBN 9027728119; x+288 pp.
