= Hadamard space =

Non-linear generalization of a Hilbert space

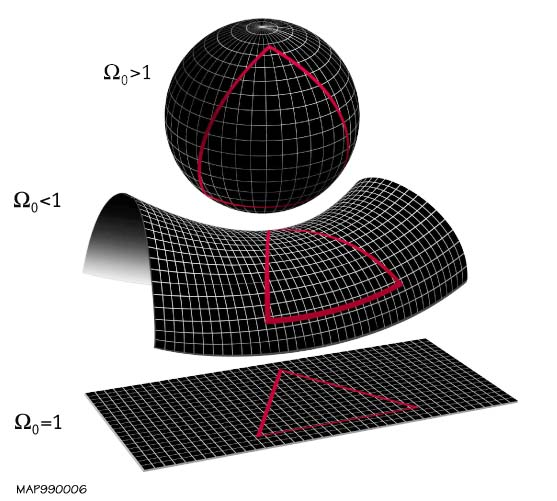
In an Hadamard space, a triangle is hyperbolic; that is, the middle one in the picture. In fact, any complete metric space where a triangle is hyperbolic is an Hadamard space.

In geometry, an Hadamard space, named after Jacques Hadamard, is a non-linear generalization of a Hilbert space. In the literature they are also equivalently defined as complete CAT(0) spaces.

An Hadamard space is defined to be a nonempty complete metric space such that, given any points $x$ and $y,$ there exists a point $m$ such that for every point $z,$
$$d(z, m)^2 + {d(x, y)^2 \over 4} \leq {d(z, x)^2 + d(z, y)^2 \over 2}.$$

The point $m$ is then the midpoint of $x$ and $y:$ $d(x, m) = d(y, m) = d(x, y)/2.$

In a Hilbert space, the above inequality is equality (with $m = (x+y)/2$), and in general an Hadamard space is said to be flat if the above inequality is equality. A flat Hadamard space is isomorphic to a closed convex subset of a Hilbert space. In particular, a normed space is an Hadamard space if and only if it is a Hilbert space.

The geometry of Hadamard spaces resembles that of Hilbert spaces, making it a natural setting for the study of rigidity theorems. In a Hadamard space, any two points can be joined by a unique geodesic between them; in particular, it is contractible. Quite generally, if $B$ is a bounded subset of a metric space, then the center of the closed ball of the minimum radius containing it is called the circumcenter of $B.$ Every bounded subset of a Hadamard space is contained in the smallest closed ball (which is the same as the closure of its convex hull). If $\Gamma$ is the group of isometries of a Hadamard space leaving invariant $B,$ then $\Gamma$ fixes the circumcenter of $B$ (Bruhat–Tits fixed point theorem).

The basic result for a non-positively curved manifold is the Cartan–Hadamard theorem. The analog holds for a Hadamard space: a complete, connected metric space which is locally isometric to a Hadamard space has an Hadamard space as its universal cover. Its variant applies for non-positively curved orbifolds. (cf. Lurie.)

Examples of Hadamard spaces are Hilbert spaces, the Poincaré disc, complete real trees (for example, complete Bruhat–Tits building), $(p, q)$-space with $p, q \geq 3$ and $2 p q \geq p + q,$ and Hadamard manifolds, that is, complete simply-connected Riemannian manifolds of nonpositive sectional curvature. Important examples of Hadamard manifolds are simply connected nonpositively curved symmetric spaces.

Applications of Hadamard spaces are not restricted to geometry. In 1998, Dmitri Burago and Serge Ferleger used CAT(0) geometry to solve a problem in dynamical billiards: in a gas of hard balls, is there a uniform bound on the number of collisions? The solution begins by constructing a configuration space for the dynamical system, obtained by joining together copies of corresponding billiard table, which turns out to be a Hadamard space.

== See also ==
- CAT(k) – a type of metric space in mathematics
- Hadamard manifold
