= List of manifolds =

This is a list of particular manifolds. See also list of geometric topology topics. For categorical listings see Category:Manifolds and its subcategories.

== Generic families of manifolds ==
- Euclidean space, R^{n}
- n-sphere, S^{n}
- n-torus, T^{n}
- Real projective space, RP^{n}
- Complex projective space, CP^{n}
- Quaternionic projective space, HP^{n}
- Flag manifold
- Grassmann manifold
- Stiefel manifold

Lie groups provide several interesting families. See Table of Lie groups for examples. See also: List of simple Lie groups and List of Lie group topics.

== Manifolds of a specific dimension ==
=== 1-manifolds ===
- Circle, S^{1}
- Long line
- Real line, R
- Real projective line, RP^{1} ≅ S^{1}

=== 2-manifolds ===
- Cylinder, S^{1} × R
- Klein bottle, RP^{2} # RP^{2}
- Klein quartic (a genus 3 surface)
- Möbius strip
- Real projective plane, RP^{2}
- Sphere, S^{2}
- Surface of genus g
- Torus
  - Double torus

=== 3-manifolds ===
- 3-sphere, S^{3}
- 3-torus, T^{3}
- Poincaré homology sphere
- SO(3) ≅ RP^{3}
- Solid Klein bottle
- Solid torus
- Whitehead manifold
- Meyerhoff manifold
- Weeks manifold

For more examples see 3-manifold.

=== 4-manifolds ===
- Complex projective plane
- Del Pezzo surface
- E_{8} manifold
- Enriques surface
- Exotic R^{4}
- Hirzebruch surface
- K3 surface

For more examples see 4-manifold.

== Special types of manifolds ==
=== Manifolds related to spheres ===
- Brieskorn manifold
- Exotic sphere
- Homology sphere
- Homotopy sphere
- Lens space
- Spherical 3-manifold

=== Special classes of Riemannian manifolds ===
- Einstein manifold
  - Ricci-flat manifold
- G_{2} manifold
- Kähler manifold
  - Calabi–Yau manifold
  - Hyperkähler manifold
- Quaternionic Kähler manifold
- Riemannian symmetric space
- Spin(7) manifold

== Categories of manifolds ==
=== Manifolds definable by a particular choice of atlas ===
- Affine manifold
- Analytic manifold
- Complex manifold
- Differentiable (smooth) manifold
- Piecewise linear manifold
- Lipschitz manifold
- Topological manifold

=== Manifolds with additional structure ===
- Almost complex manifold
- Almost symplectic manifold
- Calibrated manifold
- Complex manifold
- Contact manifold
- CR manifold
- Finsler manifold
- Hermitian manifold
- Hyperkähler manifold
- Kähler manifold
- Lie group
- Pseudo-Riemannian manifold
- Riemannian manifold
- Sasakian manifold
- Spin manifold
- Symplectic manifold

=== Infinite-dimensional manifolds ===
- Banach manifold
- Fréchet manifold
- Hilbert manifold

== See also ==
- List of topological spaces – List of concrete topologies and topological spaces
