= G2-structure =

Concept in differential geometry

In differential geometry, a $G_2$-structure is an important type of G-structure that can be defined on a smooth manifold. If M is a smooth manifold of dimension seven, then a G_{2}-structure is a reduction of structure group of the frame bundle of M to the compact, exceptional Lie group G_{2}.

== Equivalent conditions ==
The existence of a $G_2$ structure on a 7-manifold $M$ is equivalent to either of the following conditions:

- The first and second Stiefel–Whitney classes of M vanish.
- M is orientable and admits a spin structure.

It follows that the existence of a $G_2$-structure is much weaker than the existence of a metric of holonomy $G_2$, because a compact 7-manifold of holonomy $G_2$ must also have finite fundamental group and non-vanishing first Pontrjagin class.

== History ==
The fact that there might be certain Riemannian 7-manifolds manifolds of holonomy $G_2$ was first suggested by Marcel Berger's 1955 classification of possible Riemannian holonomy groups. Although still working in a complete absence of examples, Edmond Bonan then forged ahead in 1966, and investigated the properties that a manifold of holonomy $G_2$ would necessarily have; in particular, he showed that such a manifold would carry a parallel 3-form and a parallel 4-form, and that the manifold would necessarily be Ricci-flat. However, it remained unclear whether such metrics actually existed until Robert Bryant proved a local existence theorem for such metrics in 1984. The first complete (although non-compact) 7-manifolds with holonomy $G_2$ were constructed by Bryant and Simon Salamon in 1989. The first compact 7-manifolds with holonomy $G_2$ were constructed by Dominic Joyce in 1994, and compact $G_2$ manifolds are sometimes known as "Joyce manifolds", especially in the physics literature. In 2013, it was shown by M. Firat Arikan, Hyunjoo Cho, and Sema Salur that any manifold with a spin structure, and, hence, a $G_2$-structure, admits a compatible almost contact metric structure, and an explicit compatible almost contact structure was constructed for manifolds with $G_2$-structure. In the same paper, it was shown that certain classes of $G_2$-manifolds admit a contact structure.

== Remarks ==
The property of being a $G_2$-manifold is much stronger than that of admitting a $G_2$-structure. Indeed, being a $G_2$-manifold is equivalent to admitting a $G_2$-structure that is torsion-free.

The letter "G" occurring in the phrases "G-structure" and "$G_2$-structure" refers to different things. In the first case, G-structures take their name from the fact that arbitrary Lie groups are typically denoted with the letter "G". On the other hand, the letter "G" in "$G_2$" comes from the fact that its Lie algebra is the seventh type ("G" being the seventh letter of the alphabet) in the classification of complex simple Lie algebras by Élie Cartan.

== See also ==
- G_{2}, G_{2}-manifold, Spin(7) manifold
