= Calibrated geometry =

Riemannian manifold equipped with a differential p-form

In the mathematical field of differential geometry, a calibrated manifold is a Riemannian manifold (M,g) of dimension n equipped with a differential p-form φ (for some 0 ≤ p ≤ n) which is a calibration, meaning that:

- φ is closed, that is, dφ = 0, where d is the exterior derivative.
- φ has operator norm at most 1. That is, for any x ∈ M and any p-vector $\xi \in \Lambda^p T_x M$, we have φ(ξ) ≤ vol(ξ), with volume defined with respect to the Riemannian metric g.

A main reason for defining a calibration is that it creates a distinguished set of "directions" (i.e. p-planes) in which φ is actually equal to the volume form, that is, the inequality above is an equality. For x in M, set G_{x}(φ) to be the subset of such planes in the Grassmannian of p-planes in T_{x}M. In cases of interest, G_{x}(φ) is always nonempty. Let G(φ) be the union of G_{x}(φ) for all $x \in M$, viewed as a subspace of the bundle of p-planes in TM.

== History ==
Harvey and Lawson introduced the term calibration and developed the theory in 1982, but the subject has a long prehistory.

The first motivating example, that of Kähler manifolds, is due implicitly to Wirtinger in 1936 and explicitly to de Rham in 1957. In 1965, Federer used this to construct the first examples of singular minimal submanifolds.

Soon afterwards, the other main examples were introduced. Edmond Bonan studied G_{2}-manifolds and Spin(7)-manifolds in 1966, constructing all the parallel forms and showing that such manifolds must be Ricci-flat, although examples of either would not be constructed for another 20 years until the work of Robert Bryant. Quaternion-Kähler manifolds were studied simultaneously in 1965 by Edmond Bonan and Vivian Yoh Kraines, each of whom constructed the parallel 4-form. Finally, in 1970, Berger gave the general argument that calibrated submanifolds are minimal and applied it to these cases.

== Calibrated submanifolds ==
A p-dimensional submanifold Σ of M is said to be a calibrated submanifold with respect to φ (or simply φ-calibrated) if φ|_{Σ} = vol_{Σ}. Equivalently, TΣ lies in G(φ).

A famous one-line argument shows that calibrated closed submanifolds minimize volume within their homology class. Indeed, suppose that Σ is calibrated, and Σ′ is a submanifold in the same homology class. Then
$$\int_\Sigma \mathrm{vol}_\Sigma = \int_\Sigma \varphi = \int_{\Sigma'} \varphi \leq \int_{\Sigma'} \mathrm{vol}_{\Sigma'},$$
where the first equality holds because Σ is calibrated, the second equality is Stokes' theorem (as φ is closed), and the inequality holds because φ has operator norm 1.

The same argument shows that even a noncompact calibrated submanifold is a minimal submanifold in the variational sense, and therefore has zero mean curvature.

In particular, affine complex algebraic varieties are locally area-minimizing. Federer used this to give some of the first examples of singular minimal submanifolds, such as the algebraic curve $\{w^2=z^3\} \subset \mathbb{C}^2$.

== Examples ==
- On a Kähler manifold, suitably normalized powers of the Kähler form are calibrations, and the calibrated submanifolds are the complex submanifolds. This follows from the Wirtinger inequality.
- On a Calabi–Yau manifold, the real part of a holomorphic volume form (suitably normalized) is a calibration, and the calibrated submanifolds are special Lagrangian submanifolds.
- On a G_{2}-manifold, both the parallel 3-form and its Hodge dual 4-form define calibrations. The corresponding calibrated submanifolds are called associative and coassociative submanifolds.
- On a Spin(7)-manifold, the defining 4-form, known as the Cayley form, is a calibration. The corresponding calibrated submanifolds are called Cayley submanifolds.
