= Berger inequality =

In mathematics, Berger inequality may refer to

- Berger's inequality for Einstein manifolds;
- the Berger–Kazdan comparison theorem.
