= Quaternion-Kähler symmetric space =

Differential geometry concept

In differential geometry, a quaternion-Kähler symmetric space or Wolf space is a quaternion-Kähler manifold which, as a Riemannian manifold, is a Riemannian symmetric space. Any quaternion-Kähler symmetric space with positive Ricci curvature is compact and simply connected, and is a Riemannian product of quaternion-Kähler symmetric spaces associated to compact simple Lie groups.

For any compact simple Lie group G, there is a unique G/H obtained as a quotient of G by a subgroup

$$H = K \cdot \mathrm{Sp}(1).\,$$

Here, Sp(1) is the compact form of the SL(2)-triple associated with the highest root of G, and K its centralizer in G. These are classified as follows.

G	H	quaternionic dimension	geometric interpretation
$\mathrm{SU}(p+2)\,$	$\mathrm{S}(\mathrm{U}(p) \times \mathrm{U}(2))$	p	Grassmannian of complex 2-dimensional subspaces of $\mathbb{C}^{p+2}$
$\mathrm{SO}(p+4)\,$	$\mathrm{SO}(p) \cdot \mathrm{SO}(4)$	p	Grassmannian of oriented real 4-dimensional subspaces of $\mathbb{R}^{p+4}$
$\mathrm{Sp}(p+1)\,$	$\mathrm{Sp}(p) \cdot \mathrm{Sp}(1)$	p	Grassmannian of quaternionic 1-dimensional subspaces of $\mathbb{H}^{p+1}$
$E_6\,$	$\mathrm{SU}(6)\cdot\mathrm{SU}(2)$	10	Space of symmetric subspaces of $(\mathbb C\otimes\mathbb O)P^2$ isometric to $(\mathbb C\otimes \mathbb H)P^2$
$E_7\,$	$\mathrm{Spin}(12)\cdot\mathrm{Sp}(1)$	16	Rosenfeld projective plane $(\mathbb H\otimes\mathbb O)P^2$ over $\mathbb H\otimes\mathbb O$
$E_8\,$	$E_7\cdot\mathrm{Sp}(1)$	28	Space of symmetric subspaces of $(\mathbb{O}\otimes\mathbb O)P^2$ isomorphic to $(\mathbb{H}\otimes\mathbb O)P^2$
$F_4\,$	$\mathrm{Sp}(3)\cdot\mathrm{Sp}(1)$	7	Space of the symmetric subspaces of $\mathbb{OP}^2$ which are isomorphic to $\mathbb{HP}^2$
$G_2\,$	$\mathrm{SO}(4)\,$	2	Space of the subalgebras of the octonion algebra $\mathbb{O}$ which are isomorphic to the quaternion algebra $\mathbb{H}$

The twistor spaces of quaternion-Kähler symmetric spaces are the homogeneous holomorphic contact manifolds, classified by Boothby: they are the adjoint varieties of the complex semisimple Lie groups.

These spaces can be obtained by taking a projectivization of a minimal nilpotent orbit of the respective complex Lie group. The holomorphic contact structure is apparent, because the nilpotent orbits of semisimple Lie groups are equipped with the Kirillov-Kostant holomorphic symplectic form. This argument also explains how one can associate a unique Wolf space to each of the simple complex Lie groups.

== See also ==
- Quaternionic discrete series representation
