= Berger's isoembolic inequality =

Gives a lower bound on the volume of a Riemannian manifold

In mathematics, Berger's isoembolic inequality is a result in Riemannian geometry that gives a lower bound on the volume of a Riemannian manifold and also gives a necessary and sufficient condition for the manifold to be isometric to the m-dimensional sphere with its usual "round" metric. The theorem is named after the mathematician Marcel Berger, who derived it from an inequality proved by Jerry Kazdan.

== Statement of the theorem ==
Let (M, g) be a closed m-dimensional Riemannian manifold with injectivity radius inj(M). Let vol(M) denote the Riemannian volume of M and let c_{m} denote the volume of the standard m-dimensional sphere of radius one. Then

$$\mathrm{vol} (M) \geq c_m \left(\!\frac{\mathrm{inj}(M)}{\pi}\!\right)^{\!\!m},$$

with equality if and only if (M, g) is isometric to the m-sphere with its usual round metric. This result is known as Berger's isoembolic inequality. The proof relies upon an analytic inequality proved by Kazdan. The original work of Berger and Kazdan appears in the appendices of Arthur Besse's book "Manifolds all of whose geodesics are closed." At this stage, the isoembolic inequality appeared with a non-optimal constant. Sometimes Kazdan's inequality is called Berger–Kazdan inequality.
