= Hyperkähler manifold =

Type of Riemannian manifold

In differential geometry, a hyperkähler manifold is a Riemannian manifold $(M, g)$ endowed with three integrable almost complex structures $I, J, K$ that are Kähler with respect to the Riemannian metric $g$ and satisfy the quaternionic relations $I^2=J^2=K^2=IJK=-1$. In particular, it is a hypercomplex manifold. All hyperkähler manifolds are Ricci-flat and are thus Calabi–Yau manifolds. (Note: This can be easily seen by noting that Sp(n) is a subgroup of the special unitary group SU(2n).)

Hyperkähler manifolds were first given this name by Eugenio Calabi in 1979.

== Early history ==
Marcel Berger's 1955 paper on the classification of Riemannian holonomy groups first raised the issue of the existence of non-symmetric manifolds with holonomy Sp(n)·Sp(1). Interesting results were proved in the mid-1960s in pioneering work by Edmond Bonan and Kraines who have independently proven that any such manifold admits a parallel 4-form $\Omega$. Bonan's later results include a Lefschetz-type result: wedging with this powers of this 4-form induces isomorphisms $\Omega^{n-k}\wedge\bigwedge^{2k}T^*M=\bigwedge^{4n-2k}T^*M.$

== Equivalent definition in terms of holonomy ==
Equivalently, a hyperkähler manifold is a Riemannian manifold $(M, g)$ of dimension $4n$ whose holonomy group is contained in the compact symplectic group Sp(n).

Indeed, if $(M, g, I, J, K)$ is a hyperkähler manifold, then the tangent space T_{x}M is a quaternionic vector space for each point x of M, i.e. it is isomorphic to $\mathbb{H}^n$ for some integer $n$, where $\mathbb{H}$ is the algebra of quaternions. The compact symplectic group Sp(n) can be considered as the group of orthogonal transformations of $\mathbb{H}^n$ which are linear with respect to I, J and K. From this, it follows that the holonomy group of the Riemannian manifold $(M, g)$ is contained in Sp(n). Conversely, if the holonomy group of a Riemannian manifold $(M, g)$ of dimension $4n$ is contained in Sp(n), choose complex structures I_{x}, J_{x} and K_{x} on T_{x}M which make T_{x}M into a quaternionic vector space. Parallel transport of these complex structures gives the required complex structures $I, J, K$ on M making $(M, g, I, J, K)$ into a hyperkähler manifold.

== Two-sphere of complex structures ==
Every hyperkähler manifold $(M, g, I, J, K)$ has a 2-sphere of complex structures with respect to which the metric $g$ is Kähler. Indeed, for any real numbers $a, b, c$ such that

$$a^2 + b^2 + c^2 = 1 \,$$

the linear combination

$$aI + bJ + cK \,$$

is a complex structures that is Kähler with respect to $g$. If $\omega_I, \omega_J, \omega_K$ denotes the Kähler forms of $(g, I), (g, J), (g, K)$, respectively, then the Kähler form of $aI + bJ + cK$ is

$$a \omega_I + b \omega_J + c \omega_K.$$

== Holomorphic symplectic form ==
A hyperkähler manifold $(M, g, I, J, K)$, considered as a complex manifold $(M, I)$, is holomorphically symplectic (equipped with a holomorphic, non-degenerate, closed 2-form). More precisely, if $\omega_I, \omega_J, \omega_K$ denotes the Kähler forms of $(g, I), (g, J), (g, K)$, respectively, then

$$\Omega := \omega_J + i\omega_K$$

is holomorphic symplectic with respect to $I$.

Conversely, Shing-Tung Yau's proof of the Calabi conjecture implies that a compact, Kähler, holomorphically symplectic manifold $(M,I,\Omega)$ is always equipped with a compatible hyperkähler metric. Such a metric is unique in a given Kähler class. Compact hyperkähler manifolds have been extensively studied using techniques from algebraic geometry, sometimes under the name holomorphically symplectic manifolds. The holonomy group of any Calabi–Yau metric on a simply connected compact holomorphically symplectic manifold of complex dimension $2n$ with $H^{2,0}(M)=1$ is exactly Sp(n); and if the simply connected Calabi–Yau manifold instead has $H^{2,0}(M)\geq 2$, it is just the Riemannian product of lower-dimensional hyperkähler manifolds. This fact immediately follows from the Bochner formula for holomorphic forms on a Kähler manifold, together the Berger classification of holonomy groups; ironically, it is often attributed to Bogomolov, who incorrectly went on to claim in the same paper that compact hyperkähler manifolds actually do not exist!

== Examples ==
For any integer $n \ge 1$, the space $\mathbb{H}^n$ of $n$-tuples of quaternions endowed with the flat Euclidean metric is a hyperkähler manifold. The first non-trivial example discovered is the Eguchi–Hanson metric on the cotangent bundle $T^*S^2$ of the two-sphere. It was also independently discovered by Eugenio Calabi, who showed the more general statement that cotangent bundle $T^*\mathbb{CP}^n$ of any complex projective space has a complete hyperkähler metric. More generally, Birte Feix and Dmitry Kaledin showed that the cotangent bundle of any Kähler manifold has a hyperkähler structure on a neighbourhood of its zero section, although it is generally incomplete.

Due to Kunihiko Kodaira's classification of complex surfaces, we know that any compact hyperkähler 4-manifold is either a K3 surface or a compact torus $T^4$. (Every Calabi–Yau manifold in 4 (real) dimensions is a hyperkähler manifold, because SU(2) is isomorphic to Sp(1).)

As was shown by Beauville, the Hilbert scheme of k points on a compact hyperkähler 4-manifold is a hyperkähler manifold of dimension 4k. This gives rise to two series of compact examples: Hilbert schemes of points on a K3 surface and generalized Kummer varieties.

Non-compact, complete, hyperkähler 4-manifolds which are asymptotic to H/G, where H denotes the quaternions and G is a finite subgroup of Sp(1), are known as asymptotically locally Euclidean, or ALE, spaces. These spaces, and various generalizations involving different asymptotic behaviors, are studied in physics under the name gravitational instantons. The Gibbons–Hawking ansatz gives examples invariant under a circle action.

Many examples of noncompact hyperkähler manifolds arise as moduli spaces of solutions to certain gauge theory equations which arise from the dimensional reduction of the anti-self dual Yang–Mills equations: instanton moduli spaces, monopole moduli spaces, spaces of solutions to Nigel Hitchin's self-duality equations on Riemann surfaces, space of solutions to Nahm equations. Another class of examples are the Nakajima quiver varieties, which are of great importance in representation theory.

== Cohomology ==
Kurnosov, Soldatenkov & Verbitsky (2019) show that the cohomology of any compact hyperkähler manifold embeds into the cohomology of a torus, in a way that preserves the Hodge structure.

== See also ==
- Quaternion-Kähler manifold
- Hypercomplex manifold
- Quaternionic manifold
- Calabi–Yau manifold
- Gravitational instanton
- Hyperkähler quotient
- Twistor theory
