= Edmond Bonan =

French mathematician

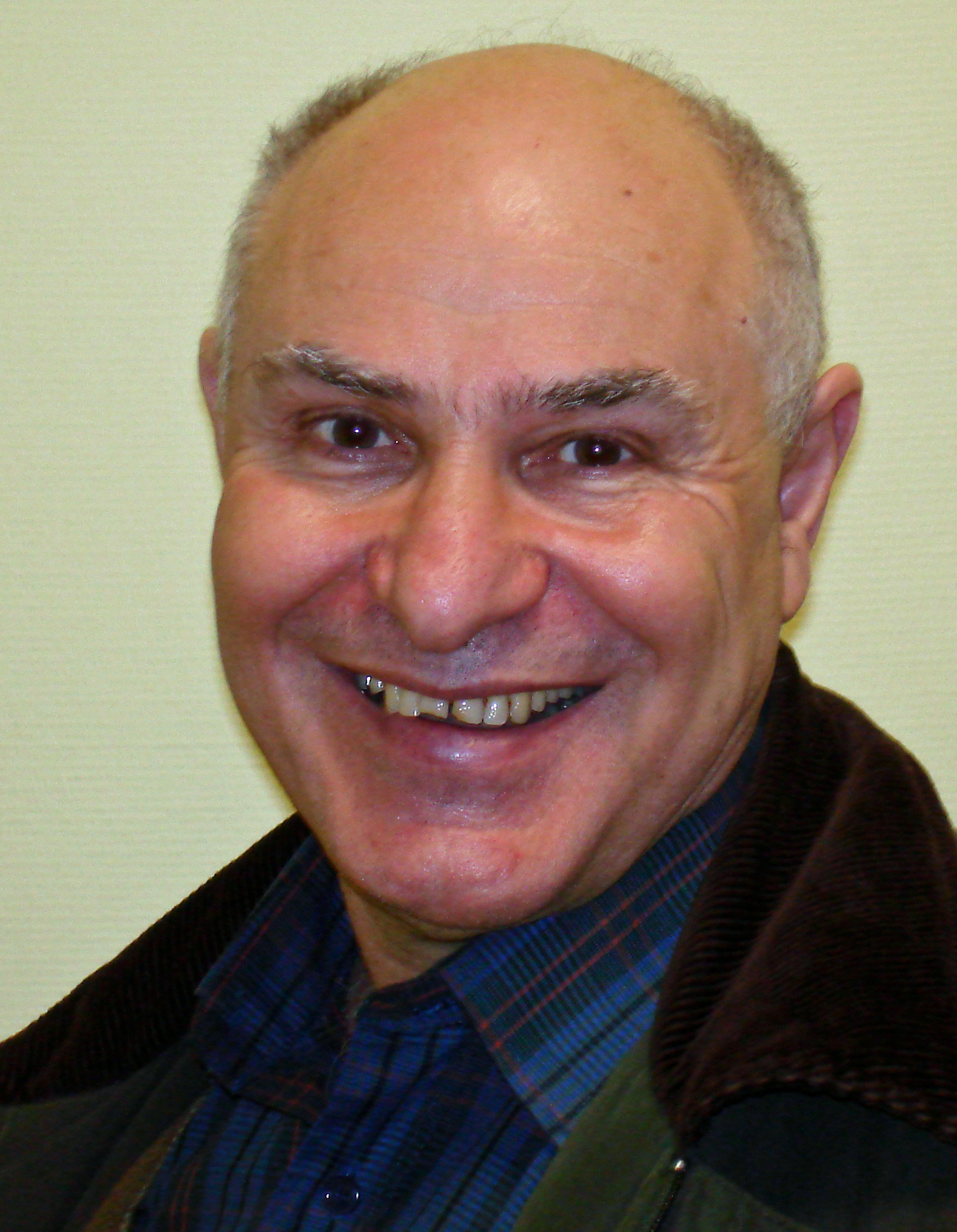
Edmond Bonan

Edmond Bonan (born 27 January 1937 in Haifa, Mandatory Palestine) is a French mathematician, known particularly for his work on special holonomy. Although not a single example of G_{2} manifold or Spin(7) manifold had been discovered until thirty years later, Edmond Bonan nonetheless made a useful contribution by showing in 1966, that such manifolds would carry at least a parallel 4-form, and would necessarily be Ricci-flat, propelling them as candidates for string theory.

== Biography ==
After completing his undergraduate studies at the École polytechnique, Bonan went on to write his 1967 University of Paris doctoral dissertation in Differential geometry under the supervision of André Lichnerowicz. From 1968 to 1997, he held the post of lecturer and then professor at the University of Picardie Jules Verne in Amiens, where he currently holds the title of professor emeritus. Early in his career, from 1969 to 1981, he also lectured at the École Polytechnique.

== See also ==
- G_{2} manifold
- G_{2} structure
- Spin(7) manifold
- Holonomy
- Quaternion-Kähler manifold
- Calibrated geometry
- Hypercomplex manifold
- Hyperkähler manifold
- Uniform polyhedron
