= Spin(7)-manifold =

Eight-dimensional Riemannian manifold

In mathematics, a Spin(7)-manifold is an eight-dimensional Riemannian manifold whose holonomy group is contained in Spin(7). Spin(7)-manifolds are Ricci-flat and admit a parallel spinor. They also admit a parallel 4-form, known as the Cayley form, which is a calibrating form for a special class of submanifolds called Cayley cycles. In fact, the Riemannian metric and the Cayley form determine each other.

== History ==
The fact that Spin(7) might possibly arise as the holonomy group of certain Riemannian 8-manifolds was first suggested by the 1955 classification theorem of Marcel Berger, and this possibility remained consistent with the simplified proof of Berger's theorem given by Jim Simons in 1962. Although not a single example of such a manifold had yet been discovered, Edmond Bonan then showed in 1966 that, if such a manifold did in fact exist, it would carry a parallel 4-form, and that it would necessarily be Ricci-flat. The first local examples of 8-manifolds with holonomy Spin(7) were finally constructed around 1984 by Robert Bryant, and his full proof of their existence appeared in the Annals of Mathematics in 1987. Next, complete (but still noncompact) 8-manifolds with holonomy Spin(7) were explicitly constructed by Bryant and S. Salamon in 1989. The first examples of compact Spin(7)-manifolds were then constructed by Dominic Joyce in 1996.

== Equivalent definition ==
By definition, a Spin(7)-manifold is a Riemannian manifold with Spin(7) holonomy. However, it is generally easier to work with an equivalent definition based on the existence of a Cayley form: a differential form with certain properties.

There are multiple equivalent ways of defining a Cayley form on an 8-manifold X. The most succinct is the following.

A Cayley form is a 4-form $\Phi\in\Omega^4(X)$ such that at each point $p\in X$, the stabilizer of $\Phi|_p$ is Spin(7).

We also require a notion of positivity. Given a vector v and a form $\omega$, let $\iota_v\omega$ denote the interior product.

A Cayley form $\Phi\in\Omega^4(X)$ is called positive if the top-dimensional forms $\Phi\wedge\Phi$ and $\iota_v\iota_u\Phi\wedge\iota_v\iota_u\Phi\wedge\Phi$ induce the same orientation whenever u and v are linearly independent. It is called negative if it is not positive.

With the above established, one can define a Spin(7)-structure.

Let $X$ be a smooth 8-manifold. A Spin(7)-structure on $X$ is a 4-form $\Phi\in\Omega^4(X)$ which restricts to a positive Cayley form on each tangent space. In this case, the pair $(X,\Phi)$ is called an almost Spin(7) manifold. An almost Spin(7) manifold $(X,\Phi)$ is called a Spin(7)-manifold if $\Phi$ is closed.

It turns out that every almost Spin(7) manifold admits a Riemannian metric which is compatible with $\Phi$ in the sense that
$$\iota_v\iota_u\Phi\wedge\iota_v\iota_u\Phi\wedge\Phi = 6|u\wedge v|^2\operatorname{vol}$$
for any pair of vectors v and u. When $\Phi$ is closed, this metric has Spin(7) holonomy.

One can also explicitly construct the metric determined by the Cayley form via Karigiannis's formula. The metric is defined up to scaling of the Cayley form.

== See also ==
- Calabi–Yau manifold
- Eight-dimensional Seiberg–Witten theory
- G_{2} manifold
