= Hitchin–Thorpe inequality =

In differential geometry the Hitchin–Thorpe inequality is a relation which restricts the topology of 4-manifolds that carry an Einstein metric.

== Statement of the Hitchin–Thorpe inequality ==
Let M be a closed, oriented, four-dimensional smooth manifold. If there exists a Riemannian metric on M which is an Einstein metric, then

$$\chi(M) \geq \frac{3}{2}|\tau(M)|,$$

where χ(M) is the Euler characteristic of M and τ(M) is the signature of M.

This inequality was first stated by John Thorpe in a footnote to a 1969 paper focusing on manifolds of higher dimension. Nigel Hitchin then rediscovered the inequality, and gave a complete characterization of the equality case in 1974; he found that if (M, g) is an Einstein manifold for which equality in the Hitchin-Thorpe inequality is obtained, then the Ricci curvature of g is zero; if the sectional curvature is not identically equal to zero, then (M, g) is a Calabi–Yau manifold whose universal cover is a K3 surface.

Already in 1961, Marcel Berger showed that the Euler characteristic is always non-negative.

== Proof ==
Let (M, g) be a four-dimensional smooth Riemannian manifold which is Einstein. Given any point p of M, there exists a g_{p}-orthonormal basis e_{1}, e_{2}, e_{3}, e_{4} of the tangent space T_{p}M such that the curvature operator Rm_{p}, which is a symmetric linear map of ∧^{2}T_{p}M into itself, has matrix

$$\begin{pmatrix}\lambda_1&0&0&\mu_1&0&0\\ 0&\lambda_2&0&0&\mu_2&0\\ 0&0&\lambda_3&0&0&\mu_3\\ \mu_1&0&0&\lambda_1&0&0\\ 0&\mu_2&0&0&\lambda_2&0\\ 0&0&\mu_3&0&0&\lambda_3\end{pmatrix}$$

relative to the basis e_{1} ∧ e_{2}, e_{1} ∧ e_{3}, e_{1} ∧ e_{4}, e_{3} ∧ e_{4}, e_{4} ∧ e_{2}, e_{2} ∧ e_{3}. One has that μ_{1} + μ_{2} + μ_{3} is zero and that λ_{1} + λ_{2} + λ_{3} is one-fourth of the scalar curvature of g at p. Furthermore, under the conditions λ_{1} ≤ λ_{2} ≤ λ_{3} and μ_{1} ≤ μ_{2} ≤ μ_{3}, each of these six functions is uniquely determined and defines a continuous real-valued function on M.

According to Chern-Weil theory, if M is oriented then the Euler characteristic and signature of M can be computed by

$$\begin{align}
\chi(M)&=\frac{1}{4\pi^2}\int_M\big(\lambda_1^2+\lambda_2^2+\lambda_3^2+\mu_1^2+\mu_2^2+\mu_3^2\big)\,d\mu_g\\
\tau(M)&=\frac{1}{3\pi^2}\int_M\big(\lambda_1\mu_1+\lambda_2\mu_2+\lambda_3\mu_3\big)\,d\mu_g.
\end{align}$$

Equipped with these tools, the Hitchin-Thorpe inequality amounts to the elementary observation

$$\lambda_1^2+\lambda_2^2+\lambda_3^2+\mu_1^2+\mu_2^2+\mu_3^2=\underbrace{(\lambda_1-\mu_1)^2+(\lambda_2-\mu_2)^2+(\lambda_3-\mu_3)^2}_{\geq 0}+2\big(\lambda_1\mu_1+\lambda_2\mu_2+\lambda_3\mu_3\big).$$

== Failure of the converse ==
A natural question to ask is whether the Hitchin–Thorpe inequality provides a sufficient condition for the existence of Einstein metrics. In 1995, Claude LeBrun and Andrea Sambusetti independently showed that the answer is no: there exist infinitely many non-homeomorphic compact, smooth, oriented 4-manifolds M that carry no Einstein metrics but nevertheless satisfy

$$\chi(M) > \frac{3}{2}|\tau(M)|.$$

LeBrun's examples are actually simply connected, and the relevant obstruction depends on the smooth structure of the manifold. By contrast, Sambusetti's obstruction only applies to 4-manifolds with infinite fundamental group, but the volume-entropy estimate he uses to prove non-existence only depends on the homotopy type of the manifold.
