= G2 (mathematics) =

Simple Lie group; the automorphism group of the octonions

In mathematics, G_{2} is three simple Lie groups (a complex form, a compact real form and a split real form), their Lie algebras $\mathfrak{g}_2,$ as well as some algebraic groups. They are the smallest of the five exceptional simple Lie groups. G_{2} has rank 2 and dimension 14. It has two fundamental representations, with dimension 7 and 14.

The compact form of G_{2} can be described as the automorphism group of the octonion algebra or, equivalently, as the subgroup of SO(7) that preserves any chosen particular vector in its 8-dimensional real spinor representation (a spin representation).

== History ==
The Lie algebra $\mathfrak{g}_2$, being the smallest exceptional simple Lie algebra, was the first of these to be discovered in the attempt to classify simple Lie algebras. On May 23, 1887, Wilhelm Killing wrote a letter to Friedrich Engel saying that he had found a 14-dimensional simple Lie algebra, which we now call $\mathfrak{g}_2$.

In 1893, Élie Cartan published a note describing an open set in $\mathbb{C}^5$ equipped with a 2-dimensional distribution—that is, a smoothly varying field of 2-dimensional subspaces of the tangent space—for which the Lie algebra $\mathfrak{g}_2$ appears as the infinitesimal symmetries. In the same year, in the same journal, Engel noticed the same thing. Later it was discovered that the 2-dimensional distribution is closely related to a ball rolling on another ball. The space of configurations of the rolling ball is 5-dimensional, with a 2-dimensional distribution that describes motions of the ball where it rolls without slipping or twisting.

In 1900, Engel discovered that a generic antisymmetric trilinear form (or 3-form) on a 7-dimensional complex vector space is preserved by a group isomorphic to the complex form of G_{2}.

In 1908 Cartan mentioned that the automorphism group of the octonions is a 14-dimensional simple Lie group. In 1914 he stated that this is the compact real form of G_{2}.

In older books and papers, G_{2} is sometimes denoted by E_{2}.

== Real forms ==
There are 3 simple real Lie algebras associated with this root system:

- The underlying real Lie algebra of the complex Lie algebra G_{2} has dimension 28. It has complex conjugation as an outer automorphism and is simply connected. The maximal compact subgroup of its associated group is the compact form of G_{2}.
- The Lie algebra of the compact form is 14-dimensional. The associated Lie group has no outer automorphisms, no center, and is simply connected and compact.
- The Lie algebra of the non-compact (split) form has dimension 14. The associated simple Lie group has fundamental group of order 2 and its outer automorphism group is the trivial group. Its maximal compact subgroup is SU(2) × SU(2)/(−1,−1). It has a non-algebraic double cover that is simply connected.

== Algebra ==
=== Dynkin diagram and Cartan matrix ===
The Dynkin diagram for G_{2} is given by .

Its Cartan matrix is:

$$\left [\begin{array}{rr}
2 & -3 \\
-1 & 2
\end{array}\right]$$

=== Roots of G_{2} ===
The 12 vector root system of G_{2} in 2 dimensions.	The A_{2} Coxeter plane projection of the 12 vertices of the cuboctahedron contain the same 2D vector arrangement.	Graph of G2 as a subgroup of F4 and E8 projected into the Coxeter plane

A set of simple roots for can be read directly from the Cartan matrix above. These are (2,−3) and (−1, 2), however the integer lattice spanned by those is not the one pictured above (from obvious reason: the hexagonal lattice on the plane cannot be generated by integer vectors). The diagram above is obtained from a different pair roots: $\alpha = \left( 1, 0 \right)$ and $\beta = \sqrt{3}\left(\cos{\frac{5\pi}{6}},\sin{\frac{5\pi}{6}}\right) = \frac{1}{2}\left(-3,\sqrt{3} \right)$.

The remaining (positive) roots are $A = \alpha + \beta,\, B = 3\alpha + \beta,\, \alpha + A = 2\alpha + \beta \,\,{\rm and }\,\, \beta + B = 3\alpha + 2\beta$.

Although they do span a 2-dimensional space, as drawn, it is much more symmetric to consider them as vectors in a 2-dimensional subspace of a three-dimensional space. In this identification α corresponds to e₁−e₂, β to −e₁ + 2e₂−e₃, A to e₂−e₃ and so on. In euclidean coordinates these vectors look as follows:

(1,−1,0), (−1,1,0) (1,0,−1), (−1,0,1) (0,1,−1), (0,−1,1)	(2,−1,−1), (−2,1,1) (1,−2,1), (−1,2,−1) (1,1,−2), (−1,−1,2)

The corresponding set of simple roots is:

e₁−e₂ = (1,−1,0), and −e₁+2e₂−e₃ = (−1,2,−1)

Note: α and A together form root system identical to A₂, while the system formed by β and B is isomorphic to A₂.

=== Weyl/Coxeter group ===
Its Weyl/Coxeter group $G = W(G_2)$ is the dihedral group $D_6$ of order 12. It has minimal faithful degree $\mu(G) = 5$.

=== Special holonomy ===
G_{2} is one of the possible special groups that can appear as the holonomy group of a Riemannian metric. The manifolds of G_{2} holonomy are also called G_{2}-manifolds.

== Polynomial invariant ==
G_{2} is the automorphism group of the following two polynomials in 7 non-commutative variables.

$$C_1 = t^2+u^2+v^2+w^2+x^2+y^2+z^2$$
$C_2 = tuv + wtx + ywu + zyt + vzw + xvy + uxz$ (± permutations)

which comes from the octonion algebra. The variables must be non-commutative otherwise the second polynomial would be identically zero.

== Generators ==
Adding a representation of the 14 generators with coefficients A, ..., N gives the matrix:

$$A\lambda_1+\cdots+N\lambda_{14}=
\begin{bmatrix}
0 & C &-B & E &-D &-G &F-M \\
-C & 0 & A & F &-G+N&D-K&-E-L \\
B &-A & 0 &-N & M & L & -K \\
-E &-F & N & 0 &-A+H&-B+I&C-J\\
D &G-N &-M &A-H& 0 & J &I \\
G &K-D& -L&B-I&-J & 0 & -H \\
-F+M&E+L& K &-C+J& -I & H & 0
\end{bmatrix}$$

It is exactly the Lie algebra of the group

$$G_2=\{g\in \mathrm{SO}(7):g^*\varphi=\varphi, \varphi = \omega^{123} + \omega^{145} + \omega^{167} + \omega^{246} - \omega^{257} - \omega^{347} - \omega^{356}\}$$

There are 480 different representations of $G_2$ corresponding to the 480 representations of octonions. The calibrated form, $\varphi$ has 30 different forms and each has 16 different signed variations. Each of the signed variations generate signed differences of $G_2$ and each is an automorphism of all 16 corresponding octonions. Hence there are really only 30 different representations of $G_2$. These can all be constructed with Clifford algebra using an invertible form $3e_{1234567}\pm\varphi$ for octonions. For other signed variations of $\varphi$, this form has remainders that classify 6 other non-associative algebras that show partial $G_2$ symmetry. An analogous calibration in $\mathrm{Spin}(15)$ leads to sedenions and at least 11 other related algebras.

== Representations ==
Embeddings of the maximal subgroups of G_{2} up to dimension 77 with associated projection matrix.

The characters of finite-dimensional representations of the real and complex Lie algebras and Lie groups are all given by the Weyl character formula. The dimensions of the smallest irreducible representations are (sequence A104599 in the OEIS):

1, 7, 14, 27, 64, 77 (twice), 182, 189, 273, 286, 378, 448, 714, 729, 748, 896, 924, 1254, 1547, 1728, 1729, 2079 (twice), 2261, 2926, 3003, 3289, 3542, 4096, 4914, 4928 (twice), 5005, 5103, 6630, 7293, 7371, 7722, 8372, 9177, 9660, 10206, 10556, 11571, 11648, 12096, 13090....

The 14-dimensional representation is the adjoint representation, and the 7-dimensional one is action of G_{2} on the imaginary octonions.

There are two non-isomorphic irreducible representations of dimensions 77, 2079, 4928, 30107, etc. The fundamental representations are those with dimensions 14 and 7 (corresponding to the two nodes in the Dynkin diagram in the order such that the triple arrow points from the first to the second).

Vogan (1994) described the (infinite-dimensional) unitary irreducible representations of the split real form of G_{2}.

The embeddings of the maximal subgroups of G_{2} up to dimension 77 are shown to the right.

== Finite groups ==
The group G_{2}(q) is the points of the algebraic group G_{2} over the finite field F_{q}. These finite groups were first introduced by Leonard Eugene Dickson in Dickson (1901) for odd q and Dickson (1905) for even q. The order of G_{2}(q) is q^{6}(q^{6} − 1)(q^{2} − 1). When q ≠ 2, the group is simple, and when q = 2, it has a simple subgroup of index 2 isomorphic to ^{2}A_{2}(3^{2}), and is the automorphism group of a maximal order of the octonions. The Janko group J_{1} was first constructed as a subgroup of G_{2}(11). Ree (1960) introduced twisted Ree groups ^{2}G_{2}(q) of order q^{3}(q^{3} + 1)(q − 1) for q = 3^{2n+1}, an odd power of 3.

== See also ==
- Cartan matrix
- Dynkin diagram
- Exceptional Jordan algebra
- Fundamental representation
- G_{2}-structure
- Lie group
- Seven-dimensional cross product
- Simple Lie group
- Star of David
