= Einstein manifold =

Riemannian manifold which satisfies vacuum Einstein equations

In differential geometry and mathematical physics, an Einstein manifold is a Riemannian or pseudo-Riemannian differentiable manifold whose Ricci tensor is proportional to the metric. They are named after Albert Einstein because this condition is equivalent to saying that the metric is a solution of the vacuum Einstein field equations (with cosmological constant), although both the dimension and the signature of the metric can be arbitrary, thus not being restricted to Lorentzian manifolds (including the four-dimensional Lorentzian manifolds usually studied in general relativity). Einstein manifolds in four Euclidean dimensions are studied as gravitational instantons.

If $M$ is the underlying $n$-dimensional manifold, and $g$ is its metric tensor, the Einstein condition means that

$$\mathrm{Ric} = kg$$

for some constant $k$, where $\operatorname{Ric}$ denotes the Ricci tensor of $g$. Einstein manifolds with $k = 0$ are called Ricci-flat manifolds.

== The Einstein condition and Einstein's equation ==
In local coordinates the condition that $(M, g)$ be an Einstein manifold is simply

$$R_{ab} = kg_{ab} .$$

Taking the trace of both sides reveals that the constant of proportionality $k$ for Einstein manifolds is related to the scalar curvature $R$ by

$$R = nk ,$$

where $n$ is the dimension of $M$.

In general relativity, Einstein's equation with a cosmological constant $\Lambda$ is

$$R_{ab} - \frac{1}{2}g_{ab}R + g_{ab}\Lambda = \kappa T_{ab},$$

where $\kappa$ is the Einstein gravitational constant. The stress–energy tensor $T_{ab}$ gives the matter and energy content of the underlying spacetime. In vacuum (a region of spacetime devoid of matter) $T_{ab} = 0$, and Einstein's equation can be rewritten in the form (assuming that $n \neq 2$):

$$R_{ab} = \frac{2\Lambda}{n-2}\,g_{ab} .$$

Therefore, vacuum solutions of Einstein's equation are (Lorentzian) Einstein manifolds with $k$ proportional to the cosmological constant.

== Examples ==
Simple examples of Einstein manifolds include:

- All 2D manifolds admit Einstein metrics. In fact, in this dimension, a metric is Einstein if and only if it has constant Gauss curvature. The classical uniformization theorem for Riemann surfaces guarantees that there is such a metric in every conformal class on any 2-manifold.
- Any manifold with constant sectional curvature is an Einstein manifold—in particular:
  - Euclidean space, which is flat, is a simple example of Ricci-flat, hence Einstein metric.
  - The n-sphere, $S^n$, with the round metric is Einstein with $k=n-1$.
  - Hyperbolic space with the canonical metric is Einstein with $k = -(n - 1)$.
- Complex projective space, $\mathbf{CP}^n$, with the Fubini–Study metric, have $k = 2n + 2.$
- Calabi–Yau manifolds admit an Einstein metric that is also Kähler, with Einstein constant $k=0$. Such metrics are not unique, but rather come in families; there is a Calabi–Yau metric in every Kähler class, and the metric also depends on the choice of complex structure. For example, there is a 60-parameter family of such metrics on K3, 57 parameters of which give rise to Einstein metrics which are not related by isometries or rescalings.
- Kähler–Einstein metrics exist on a variety of compact complex manifolds due to the existence results of Shing-Tung Yau, and the later study of K-stability especially in the case of Fano manifolds.
- Irreducible symmetric spaces, as classified by Élie Cartan, are always Einstein. Among these spaces, the compact ones all have positive Einstein constant $k$. Examples of these include the Grassmannians $Gr (k, \mathbb{R}^\ell)$, $Gr (k, \mathbb{C}^\ell)$, and $Gr (k, \mathbb{H}^\ell)$. Every such compact space has a so-called non-compact dual, which instead has negative Einstein constant $k$. These dual pairs are related in manner that is exactly parallel to the relationship between spheres and hyperbolic spaces.

One necessary condition for closed, oriented, 4-manifolds to be Einstein is satisfying the Hitchin–Thorpe inequality. However, this necessary condition is very far from sufficient, as further obstructions have been discovered by LeBrun, Sambusetti, and others.

== Applications ==
Four dimensional Riemannian Einstein manifolds are also important in mathematical physics as gravitational instantons in quantum theories of gravity. The term "gravitational instanton" is sometimes restricted to Einstein 4-manifolds whose Weyl tensor is anti-self-dual, and it is very often assumed that the metric is asymptotic to the standard metric on a finite quotient Euclidean 4-space (and are therefore complete but non-compact). In differential geometry, simply connected self-dual Einstein 4-manifolds are coincide with the 4-dimensional, reverse-oriented hyperkähler manifolds in the Ricci-flat case, but are sometimes called quaternion Kähler manifolds otherwise.

Higher-dimensional Lorentzian Einstein manifolds are used in modern theories of gravity, such as string theory, M-theory and supergravity. Hyperkähler and quaternion Kähler manifolds (which are special kinds of Einstein manifolds) also have applications in physics as target spaces for nonlinear σ-models with supersymmetry.

Compact Einstein manifolds have been much studied in differential geometry, and many examples are known, although constructing them is often challenging. Compact Ricci-flat manifolds are particularly difficult to find: in the monograph on the subject by the pseudonymous author Arthur Besse, readers are offered a meal in a starred restaurant in exchange for a new example.

== See also ==
- Einstein–Hermitian vector bundle
- Osserman manifold

== Notes and references ==
- Besse, Arthur L. (1987). Einstein Manifolds. Classics in Mathematics. Berlin: Springer. ISBN 3-540-74120-8.
