= G2 manifold =

Seven-dimensional Riemannian manifold

In differential geometry, a G_{2} manifold or Joyce manifold is a seven-dimensional Riemannian manifold with holonomy group contained in G_{2}. The group $G_2$ is one of the five exceptional simple Lie groups. It can be described as the automorphism group of the octonions, or equivalently, as a proper subgroup of special orthogonal group SO(7) that preserves a spinor in the eight-dimensional spinor representation or lastly as the subgroup of the general linear group GL(7) which preserves the non-degenerate 3-form $\phi$, the associative form. The Hodge dual, $\psi=*\phi$ is then a parallel 4-form, the coassociative form. These forms are calibrations in the sense of Reese Harvey and H. Blaine Lawson, and thus define special classes of 3- and 4-dimensional submanifolds.

== Properties ==
All $G_2$-manifold are 7-dimensional, Ricci-flat, orientable spin manifolds. In addition, any compact manifold with holonomy equal to $G_2$ has finite fundamental group, non-zero first Pontryagin class, and non-zero third and fourth Betti numbers.

== History ==
The fact that $G_2$ might possibly be the holonomy group of certain Riemannian 7-manifolds was first suggested by the 1955 classification theorem of Marcel Berger, and this remained consistent with the simplified proof later given by Jim Simons in 1962. Although not a single example of such a manifold had yet been discovered, Edmond Bonan nonetheless made a useful contribution by showing that, if such a manifold did in fact exist, it would carry both a parallel 3-form and a parallel 4-form, and that it would necessarily be Ricci-flat.

The first local examples of 7-manifolds with holonomy $G_2$ were finally constructed around 1984 by Robert Bryant, and his full proof of their existence appeared in the Annals in 1987. Next, complete (but still noncompact) 7-manifolds with holonomy $G_2$ were constructed by Bryant and Simon Salamon in 1989. The first compact 7-manifolds with holonomy $G_2$ were constructed by Dominic Joyce in 1994. Compact $G_2$ manifolds are therefore sometimes known as "Joyce manifolds", especially in the physics literature.

In 2015, a new construction of compact $G_2$ manifolds, due to Alessio Corti, Mark Haskins, Johannes Nordstrőm, and Tommaso Pacini, combined a gluing idea suggested by Simon Donaldson with new algebro-geometric and analytic techniques for constructing Calabi–Yau manifolds with cylindrical ends, resulting in tens of thousands of diffeomorphism types of new examples.

== Connections to physics ==
These manifolds are important in string theory. They break the original supersymmetry to 1/8 of the original amount. For example, M-theory compactified on a $G_2$ manifold leads to a realistic four-dimensional (11-7=4) theory with N=1 supersymmetry. The resulting low energy effective supergravity contains a single supergravity supermultiplet, a number of chiral supermultiplets equal to the third Betti number of the $G_2$ manifold and a number of U(1) vector supermultiplets equal to the second Betti number.

== See also ==
- Calabi–Yau manifold
- Seven-dimensional Seiberg–Witten theory
- Spin(7)-manifold
