= Quaternion-Kähler manifold =

In differential geometry, a quaternion-Kähler manifold (or quaternionic Kähler manifold) is a Riemannian 4n-manifold whose Riemannian holonomy group is a subgroup of Sp(n)·Sp(1) for some $n\geq 2$. Here Sp(n) is the sub-group of $SO(4n)$ consisting of those orthogonal transformations that arise by left-multiplication by some quaternionic $n \times n$ matrix, while the group $Sp(1) = S^3$ of unit-length quaternions instead acts on quaternionic $n$-space ${\mathbb H}^n = {\mathbb R}^{4n}$ by right scalar multiplication. The Lie group $Sp(n)\cdot Sp(1) \subset SO(4n)$ generated by combining these actions is then abstractly isomorphic to $[Sp(n) \times Sp(1) ]/{\mathbb Z}_2$.

Although the above loose version of the definition includes hyperkähler manifolds, the standard convention of excluding these will be followed by also requiring that the scalar curvature be non-zero— as is automatically true if the holonomy group equals the entire group Sp(n)·Sp(1).

== Early history ==
Marcel Berger's 1955 paper on the classification of Riemannian holonomy groups first raised the issue of the existence of non-symmetric manifolds with holonomy Sp(n)·Sp(1). Interesting results were proved in the mid-1960s in pioneering work by Edmond Bonan and Kraines who have independently proven that any such manifold admits a parallel 4-form $\Omega$. A quaternion-Kähler analog of the hard Lefschetz theorem was later proved by Bonan.

In the context of Berger's classification of Riemannian holonomies, quaternion-Kähler manifolds constitute the only class of irreducible, non-symmetric manifolds of special holonomy that are automatically Einstein, but not automatically Ricci-flat. If the Einstein constant of a simply connected manifold with holonomy in $Sp(n) Sp(1)$ is zero, where $n\geq 2$, then the holonomy is actually contained in $Sp(n)$, and the manifold is hyperkähler. This case is excluded from the definition by declaring quaternion-Kähler to mean not only that the holonomy group is contained in $Sp(n) Sp(1)$, but also that the manifold has non-zero (constant) scalar curvature.

With this convention, quaternion-Kähler manifolds can thus be naturally divided into those for which the Ricci curvature is positive, and those for which it is instead negative.

== Examples ==
There are no known examples of compact quaternion-Kähler manifolds that are not locally symmetric. (Again, hyperkähler manifolds are excluded from the discussion by fiat.) On the other hand, there are many symmetric quaternion-Kähler manifolds; these were first classified by Joseph A. Wolf, and so are known as Wolf spaces. For any simple Lie group G, there is a unique Wolf space G/K obtained as a quotient of G by a subgroup $K = K_0 \cdot \operatorname{SU}(2)$, where $SU(2)$ is the subgroup associated with the highest root of G, and K_{0} is its centralizer in G. The Wolf spaces with positive Ricci curvature are compact and simply connected. For example, if $G= Sp(n+1)$, the corresponding Wolf space is the quaternionic projective space $\mathbb{HP}_n$ of (right) quaternionic lines through the origin in $\mathbb{H}^{n+1}$.

A conjecture often attributed to LeBrun and Salamon (see below) asserts that all complete quaternion-Kähler manifolds of positive scalar curvature are symmetric. By contrast, however, constructions of Galicki-Lawson and of LeBrun show that complete, non-locally-symmetric quaternion-Kähler manifolds of negative scalar curvature exist in great profusion. The Galicki-Lawson construction just cited also gives rise to vast numbers of compact non-locally-symmetric orbifold examples with positive Einstein constant, and many of these in turn give rise to compact, non-singular 3-Sasakian Einstein manifolds of dimension $4n+3$.

== Twistor spaces ==
Questions about quaternion-Kähler manifolds can be translated into the language of complex geometry using the methods of twistor theory; this fact is encapsulated in a theorem discovered independently by Salamon and Bérard-Bergery, and inspired by earlier work of Penrose. Let $M$ be a quaternion-Kähler manifold, and $H$ be the sub-bundle of $End(TM)$ arising from the holonomy action of $\mathfrak{sp}(1) \subset \mathfrak{sp}(n)\oplus \mathfrak{sp}(1)$. Then $H$ contains an $S^2$-bundle $Z\to M$ consisting of all $j\in H$ that satisfy $j^2=-1$. The points of $Z$ thus represent complex structures on tangent spaces of $M$. Using this, the total space $Z$ can then be equipped with a tautological almost complex structure. Salamon (and, independently, Bérard-Bergery) proved that this almost complex structure is integrable, thereby making $Z$ into a complex manifold.

When the Ricci curvature of M is positive, Z is a Fano manifold, and so, in particular, is a smooth projective algebraic complex variety. Moreover, it admits a Kähler–Einstein metric, and, more importantly, comes equipped with a holomorphic contact structure, corresponding to the horizontal spaces of the Riemannian connection on H. These facts were used by LeBrun and Salamon to prove that, up to isometry and rescaling, there are only finitely many positive-scalar-curvature compact quaternion-Kähler manifolds in any given dimension. This same paper also shows that any such manifold is actually a symmetric space unless its second homology is a finite group with non-trivial 2-torsion. Related techniques had also been used previously by Poon and Salamon to show that there are no non-symmetric examples at all in dimension 8.

In the converse direction, a result of LeBrun shows that any Fano manifold that admits both a Kähler–Einstein metric and a holomorphic contact structure is actually the twistor space of a quaternion-Kähler manifold of positive scalar curvature, which is moreover unique up to isometries and rescalings.
