= Marcel Berger =

French mathematician (1927-2016)

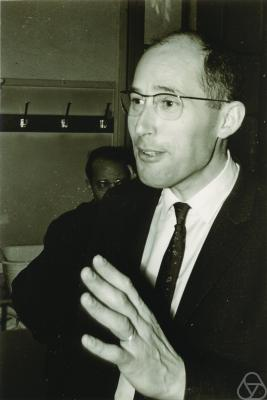
- Marcel Berger in 1968 (photo from MFO)
- Born: Marcel Yves Marie Joseph Berger; 14 April 1927; Paris, France
- Died: 15 October 2016 (aged 89); Paris, France
- Education: École normale supérieure (Paris); University of Paris
- Known for: Berger–Kazdan comparison theorem; Berger classification; Berger's sphere; Berger's inequality for Einstein manifolds
- Awards: Leconte Prize (1978)
- Scientific career
- Fields: Mathematics
- Workplaces: University of Strasbourg; Université Nice-Sophia-Antipolis; Paris Diderot University; Institut des Hautes Études Scientifiques
- Thesis: Sur des groupes d'holonomies des variétés riemanniennes et des variétés affinés sans torsion (1954)
- Doctoral advisor: André Lichnerowicz
- Doctoral students: Jean-Pierre Bourguignon; Yves Colin de Verdière; Sylvestre Gallot; Dominique Hulin; François Labourie; Pierre Pansu

Marcel Berger (14 April 1927 – 15 October 2016) was a French mathematician, working in the field of differential geometry, and a former director of the Institut des Hautes Études Scientifiques (IHÉS), France.

== Biography ==
After studying from 1948 to 1951 at the École normale supérieure in Paris, Berger obtained in 1954 his PhD from the University of Paris, with thesis written under the direction of André Lichnerowicz. From 1958 to 1964 he taught at the University of Strasbourg and had visiting positions at the Massachusetts Institute of Technology and the University of California, Berkeley. From 1964 to 1966 he taught at the University of Nice, after which he joined the University of Paris VII. From 1985 to 1993 he served as director of the IHÉS. He was President of the French Mathematical Society in 1979–1980.

Formerly residing in Le Castera in Lasseube, Berger was instrumental in Mikhail Gromov's accepting positions both at the University of Paris and at the IHÉS.

== Awards and honors ==
- 1956 Prix Peccot, Collège de France
- 1962 Prix Maurice Audin
- 1969 Prix Carrière, Académie des Sciences
- 1978 Prix Leconte, Académie des Sciences
- 1979 Prix Gaston Julia
- 1991 Lester R. Ford Award

== Selected publications ==
- Berger, Marcel: Sur les groupes d'holonomie homogène des variétés à connexion affine et des variétés riemanniennes. (French) Bull. Soc. Math. France 83 (1955), 279–330.
- Berger, Marcel: Les espaces symétriques noncompacts. (French) Ann. Sci. École Norm. Sup. (3) 74 1957 85–177.
- Berger, M.: Les variétés riemanniennes homogènes normales simplement connexes à courbure strictement positive. (French) Ann. Scuola Norm. Sup. Pisa (3) 15 1961 179–246.
- Berger, Marcel; Gauduchon, Paul; Mazet, Edmond: Le spectre d'une variété riemannienne. (French) Lecture Notes in Mathematics, Vol. 194 Springer-Verlag, Berlin-New York 1971.
- Berger, M.: Blaschke's Conjecture for Sphere, in Besse, A. L. (1978). Manifolds all of whose Geodesics are Closed. Berlin Heidelberg: Springer-Verlag. ISBN 978-3-540-08158-6.
- Berger, Marcel; Gostiaux, Bernard (1988). Differential Geometry: manifolds, curves, and surfaces. Graduate Texts in Mathematics. Translated by Levy, Silvio. New York: Springer. ISBN 978-0-387-96626-7.
- Berger, Marcel: Systoles et applications selon Gromov. (French) [Systoles and their applications according to Gromov] Séminaire Bourbaki, Vol. 1992/93. Astérisque No. 216 (1993), Exp. No. 771, 5, 279–310.
- Berger, Marcel: Riemannian geometry during the second half of the twentieth century. Reprint of the 1998 original. University Lecture Series, 17. American Mathematical Society, Providence, Rhode Island, 2000. x+182 pp. ISBN 0-8218-2052-4
- Berger, Marcel (Feb 2000). "Encounter with a Geometer, Part I" (PDF). Notices of the AMS. 47 (2): 183–194.
- Berger, Marcel (Mar 2000). "Encounter with a Geometer, Part II" (PDF). Notices of the AMS. 47 (3): 326–340.
- Berger, Marcel (2003). A Panoramic View of Riemannian Geometry. Springer-Verlag. ISBN 3-540-65317-1.
- Berger, M.: What is... a Systole? Notices of the AMS 55 (2008), no. 3, 374–376. online text
- Berger, Marcel (2009). Geometry I. Universitext. Translated by Cole, M.; Levy, S. Berlin; New York: Springer-Verlag. ISBN 978-3-540-11658-5.
- Berger, Marcel (2009). Geometry II. Universitext. Translated by Cole, M.; Levy, S. Berlin; New York: Springer-Verlag. ISBN 978-3-540-17015-0.
- Berger, Marcel (2010). Geometry Revealed. Heidelberg; New York: Springer. ISBN 978-3-540-70996-1. OCLC 280446977.

== See also ==
- Arthur Besse
- Berger's inequality for Einstein manifolds
- Berger–Kazdan comparison theorem
- Musical isomorphism
- Parametrix
- Quaternion-Kähler manifold
- Spin(7)-manifold
- Symmetric space
- Systolic geometry
