= Gromov's theorem =

Gromov's theorem may mean one of a number of results of Mikhail Gromov:

- One of Gromov's compactness theorems:
  - Gromov's compactness theorem (geometry) in Riemannian geometry
  - Gromov's compactness theorem (topology) in symplectic topology
- Gromov's Betti number theorem
- Gromov–Ruh theorem on almost flat manifolds
- Gromov's non-squeezing theorem in symplectic geometry
- Gromov's theorem on groups of polynomial growth

== See also ==
- Bishop–Gromov inequality
- Gromov–Thurston 2π theorem
