= Curvature of Space and Time, with an Introduction to Geometric Analysis =

Differential geometry textbook

- First edition
- Author: Iva Stavrov
- Language: English
- Subject: Differential geometry
- Genre: Textbook
- Publisher: American Mathematical Society
- Publication date: 2020
- Publication place: United States

Curvature of Space and Time, with an Introduction to Geometric Analysis is an undergraduate-level textbook for mathematics and physics students on differential geometry, focusing on applications to general relativity. It was written by Iva Stavrov, based on a course she taught at the 2013 Park City Mathematics Institute and subsequently at Lewis & Clark College, and was published in 2020 by the American Mathematical Society, as part of their Student Mathematical Library book series.

== Topics ==
Curvature of Space and Time is arranged into five chapters with 14 sections in total, with each section covering a single lecture's worth of material. Its topics are covered both mathematically and historically, with reference to the original source material of Bernhard Riemann and others. However, it deliberately avoids some topics from differential topology that have traditionally been covered in differential geometry courses, including abstract manifolds and tangent vectors. Instead, it approaches the subject through coordinate-based geometry, emphasizing quantities that are invariant under changes of coordinates. Its goals include both providing a shortened path for students to reach an understanding of Einstein's mathematics, and promoting curvature as a central way of describing shape and geometry.

The first chapter defines Riemannian manifolds as embedded subsets of Euclidean spaces rather than as abstract spaces. It uses Christoffel symbols to formulate differential equations having the geodesics as their solutions, and describes the Koszul formula and energy functional Examples include the Euclidean metric, spherical geometry, projective geometry, and the Poincaré half-plane model of the hyperbolic plane. Chapter 2 includes vector fields, gradients, divergence, directional derivatives, tensor calculus, Lie brackets, Green's identities, the maximum principle, and the Levi-Civita connection. It begins a discussion of curvature and the Riemann curvature tensor that is continued into Chapter 3, "the heart of the book", whose topics include Jacobi fields, Ricci curvature, scalar curvature, Myers's theorem, the Bishop–Gromov inequality, and parallel transport.

After these mathematical preliminaries, the final two chapters are more physical, with the fourth chapter concerning special relativity, general relativity, the Schwarzschild metric, and Kruskal–Szekeres coordinates. Topics in the final chapter include geometric analysis, Poisson's equation for the potential fields of charge distributions, and mass in general relativity.

== Audience and reception ==
As is usual for a textbook, Curvature of Space and Time has exercises that extend the coverage of its topics and make it suitable as the text for undergraduate courses. Although there are multiple undergraduate-level textbooks on differential geometry, they have generally taken an abstract mathematical view of the subject, and at the time of publishing of Curvature of Space and Time, courses based on this material had somewhat fallen out of fashion. This book is unusual in taking a more direct approach to the parts of the subject that are most relevant to physics. However, although it attempts to cover this material in a self-contained way, reviewer Mark Hunacek warns that it may be too advanced for typical mathematics students, and perhaps better reserved for honors students as well as "mathematically sophisticated physics majors". He also suggests the book as an introduction to the area for researchers in other topics.

Reviewer Hans-Bert Rademacher calls this a "remarkable book", with "excellent motivations and insights", but suggests it as a supplement to standard texts and courses rather than as the main basis for teaching this material. And although finding fault with a few details, reviewer Justin Corvino suggests that, with faculty guidance over these rough spots, the book would be suitable both for independent study or an advanced topics course, and "required reading" for students enthusiastic about learning the mathematics behind Einstein's theories.
