= Mikhael Gromov (mathematician) =

Russian-French mathematician

- Михаил Громов
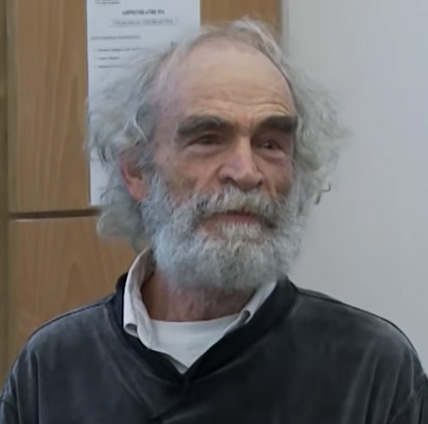
- Gromov in 2014
- Born: 23 December 1943 (age 82); Boksitogorsk, Russian SFSR, Soviet Union
- Citizenship: Russian and French
- Education: Leningrad State University (PhD)
- Known for: List Geometric group theory Symplectic geometry Systolic geometry Gromov boundary Gromov's compactness theorem (geometry); Gromov's compactness theorem (topology); Gromov's theorem on groups of polynomial growth Gromov–Hausdorff convergence Gromov–Ruh theorem Gromov–Witten invariant Gromov hyperbolic group Gromov δ-hyperbolic space Gromov norm Gromov product Gromov topology Gromov's inequality for complex projective space Gromov's systolic inequality Bishop–Gromov inequality Asymptotic dimension Essential manifold Filling area conjecture Filling radius Mean dimension Minimal volume Non-squeezing theorem Pseudoholomorphic curve Random group Sofic group Systolic freedom 2π theorem
- Awards: Oswald Veblen Prize in Geometry (1981); Wolf Prize (1993); Balzan Prize (1999); Kyoto Prize (2002); Nemmers Prize in Mathematics (2004); Bolyai Prize (2005); Abel Prize (2009)
- Scientific career
- Fields: Mathematics
- Workplaces: Institut des Hautes Études Scientifiques; New York University
- Doctoral advisor: Vladimir Rokhlin
- Doctoral students: Denis Auroux; François Labourie; Pierre Pansu; Mikhail Katz

Mikhael Leonidovich Gromov (also Mikhail Gromov, Michael Gromov or Misha Gromov; Russian: Михаил Леонидович Громов; born 23 December 1943) is a Russian-French mathematician known for his work in geometry, analysis and group theory. He is a permanent member of Institut des Hautes Études Scientifiques in France and a professor of mathematics at New York University.

Gromov has won several prizes, including the Abel Prize in 2009 "for his revolutionary contributions to geometry".

== Early years, education and career ==
Mikhail Gromov was born on 23 December 1943 in Boksitogorsk, Soviet Union. His father Leonid Gromov was Russian and his mother Lea was of Jewish heritage. Both were pathologists. His mother was the cousin of World Chess Champion Mikhail Botvinnik, as well as of the mathematician Isaak Moiseevich Rabinovich. Gromov was born during World War II, and his mother, who worked as a medical doctor in the Soviet Army, had to leave the front line in order to give birth to him. When Gromov was nine years old, his mother gave him the book The Enjoyment of Mathematics by Hans Rademacher and Otto Toeplitz, a book that piqued his curiosity and had a great influence on him.

Gromov studied mathematics at Leningrad State University where he obtained a master's degree in 1965, a doctorate in 1969 and defended his postdoctoral thesis in 1973. His thesis advisor was Vladimir Rokhlin.

Gromov married in 1967. In 1970, he was invited to give a presentation at the International Congress of Mathematicians in Nice, France. However, he was not allowed to leave the USSR. Still, his lecture was published in the conference proceedings.

Disagreeing with the Soviet system, he had been thinking of emigrating since the age of 14. In the early 1970s he ceased publication, hoping that this would help his application to move to Israel. He changed his last name to that of his mother. He received a coded letter saying that, if he could get out of the Soviet Union, he could go to Stony Brook, where a position had been arranged for him. When the request was granted in 1974, he moved directly to New York and worked at Stony Brook.

In 1981 he left Stony Brook University to join the faculty of University of Paris VI and in 1982 he became a permanent professor at the Institut des Hautes Études Scientifiques where he remains today. At the same time, he has held professorships at the University of Maryland, College Park from 1991 to 1996, and at the Courant Institute of Mathematical Sciences in New York since 1996. He adopted French citizenship in 1992.

Upon the release of the Epstein files in 2026, it was revealed that Gromov was in contact with Epstein after his 2008 conviction.

== Work ==
Gromov's style of geometry often features a "coarse" or "soft" viewpoint, analyzing asymptotic or large-scale properties.^{[G00]} He is also interested in mathematical biology, the structure of the brain and the thinking process, and the way scientific ideas evolve.

Motivated by Nash and Kuiper's isometric embedding theorems and the results on immersions by Morris Hirsch and Stephen Smale, Gromov introduced the h-principle in various formulations. Modeled upon the special case of the Hirsch–Smale theory, he introduced and developed the general theory of microflexible sheaves, proving that they satisfy an h-principle on open manifolds.^{[G69]} As a consequence (among other results) he was able to establish the existence of positively curved and negatively curved Riemannian metrics on any open manifold whatsoever. His result is in counterpoint to the well-known topological restrictions (such as the Cheeger–Gromoll soul theorem or Cartan–Hadamard theorem) on geodesically complete Riemannian manifolds of positive or negative curvature. After this initial work, he developed further h-principles partly in collaboration with Yakov Eliashberg, including work building upon Nash and Kuiper's theorem and the Nash–Moser implicit function theorem. There are many applications of his results, including topological conditions for the existence of exact Lagrangian immersions and similar objects in symplectic and contact geometry. His well-known book Partial Differential Relations collects most of his work on these problems.^{[G86]} Later, he applied his methods to complex geometry, proving certain instances of the Oka principle on deformation of continuous maps to holomorphic maps.^{[G89]} His work initiated a renewed study of the Oka–Grauert theory, which had been introduced in the 1950s.

Gromov and Vitali Milman gave a formulation of the concentration of measure phenomenon.^{[GM83]} They defined a "Lévy family" as a sequence of normalized metric measure spaces in which any asymptotically nonvanishing sequence of sets can be metrically thickened to include almost every point. This closely mimics the phenomenon of the law of large numbers, and in fact the law of large numbers can be put into the framework of Lévy families. Gromov and Milman developed the basic theory of Lévy families and identified a number of examples, most importantly coming from sequences of Riemannian manifolds in which the lower bound of the Ricci curvature or the first eigenvalue of the Laplace–Beltrami operator diverges to infinity. They also highlighted a feature of Lévy families in which any sequence of continuous functions must be asymptotically almost constant. These considerations have been taken further by other authors, such as Michel Talagrand.

Since the seminal 1964 publication of James Eells and Joseph Sampson on harmonic maps, various rigidity phenomena have been deduced from the combination of an existence theorem for harmonic mappings together with a vanishing theorem asserting that (certain) harmonic mappings must be totally geodesic or holomorphic. Gromov had the insight that the extension of this program to the setting of mappings into metric spaces would imply new results on discrete groups, following Margulis superrigidity. Richard Schoen carried out the analytical work to extend the harmonic map theory to the metric space setting; this was subsequently done more systematically by Nicholas Korevaar and Schoen, establishing extensions of most of the standard Sobolev space theory. A sample application of Gromov and Schoen's methods is the fact that lattices in the isometry group of the quaternionic hyperbolic space are arithmetic.^{[GS92]}

=== Riemannian geometry ===
In 1978, Gromov introduced the notion of almost flat manifolds.^{[G78]} The famous quarter-pinched sphere theorem in Riemannian geometry says that if a complete Riemannian manifold has sectional curvatures which are all sufficiently close to a given positive constant, then M must be finitely covered by a sphere. In contrast, it can be seen by scaling that every closed Riemannian manifold has Riemannian metrics whose sectional curvatures are arbitrarily close to zero. Gromov showed that if the scaling possibility is broken by only considering Riemannian manifolds of a fixed diameter, then a closed manifold admitting such a Riemannian metric, with sectional curvatures sufficiently close to zero, must be finitely covered by a nilmanifold. The proof works by replaying the proofs of the Bieberbach theorem and Margulis lemma. Gromov's proof was given a careful exposition by Peter Buser and Hermann Karcher.

In 1979, Richard Schoen and Shing-Tung Yau showed that the class of smooth manifolds which admit Riemannian metrics of positive scalar curvature is topologically rich. In particular, they showed that this class is closed under the operation of connected sum and of surgery in codimension at least three. Their proof used elementary methods of partial differential equations, in particular to do with the Green's function. Gromov and Blaine Lawson gave another proof of Schoen and Yau's results, making use of elementary geometric constructions.^{[GL80b]} They also showed how purely topological results such as Stephen Smale's h-cobordism theorem could then be applied to draw conclusions such as the fact that every closed and simply-connected smooth manifold of dimension 5, 6, or 7 has a Riemannian metric of positive scalar curvature. They further introduced the new class of enlargeable manifolds, distinguished by a condition in homotopy theory.^{[GL80a]} They showed that Riemannian metrics of positive scalar curvature cannot exist on such manifolds. A particular consequence is that the torus cannot support any Riemannian metric of positive scalar curvature, which had been a major conjecture previously resolved by Schoen and Yau in low dimensions.

In 1981, Gromov identified topological restrictions, based upon Betti numbers, on manifolds which admit Riemannian metrics of nonnegative sectional curvature.^{[G81a]} The principal idea of his work was to combine Karsten Grove and Katsuhiro Shiohama's Morse theory for the Riemannian distance function, with control of the distance function obtained from the Toponogov comparison theorem, together with the Bishop–Gromov inequality on the volume of geodesic balls. This resulted in topologically controlled covers of the manifold by geodesic balls, to which spectral sequence arguments could be applied to control the topology of the underlying manifold. The topology of lower bounds on sectional curvature is still not fully understood, and Gromov's work remains a primary result. As an application of Hodge theory, Peter Li and Yau were able to apply their gradient estimates to find similar Betti number estimates which are weaker than Gromov's but allow the manifold to have a convex boundary.

In Jeff Cheeger's fundamental compactness theory for Riemannian manifolds, a key step in constructing coordinates on the limiting space is an injectivity radius estimate for closed manifolds. Cheeger, Gromov, and Michael Taylor localized Cheeger's estimate, showing how to use Bishop−Gromov volume comparison to control the injectivity radius in absolute terms by curvature bounds and volumes of geodesic balls.^{[CGT82]} Their estimate has been used in a number of places where the construction of coordinates is an important problem. A particularly well-known instance of this is to show that Grigori Perelman's "noncollapsing theorem" for Ricci flow, which controls volume, is sufficient to allow applications of Richard Hamilton's compactness theory. Cheeger, Gromov, and Taylor applied their injectivity radius estimate to prove Gaussian control of the heat kernel, although these estimates were later improved by Li and Yau as an application of their gradient estimates.

Gromov made foundational contributions to systolic geometry. Systolic geometry studies the relationship between size invariants (such as volume or diameter) of a manifold M and its topologically non-trivial submanifolds (such as non-contractible curves). In his 1983 paper "Filling Riemannian manifolds"^{[G83]} Gromov proved that every essential manifold $M$ with a Riemannian metric contains a closed non-contractible geodesic of length at most $C(n)\operatorname{Vol}(M)^{1/n}$.

=== Gromov−Hausdorff convergence and geometric group theory ===
In 1981, Gromov introduced the Gromov–Hausdorff metric, which endows the set of all metric spaces with the structure of a metric space.^{[G81b]} More generally, one can define the Gromov-Hausdorff distance between two metric spaces, relative to the choice of a point in each space. Although this does not give a metric on the space of all metric spaces, it is sufficient in order to define "Gromov-Hausdorff convergence" of a sequence of pointed metric spaces to a limit. Gromov formulated an important compactness theorem in this setting, giving a condition under which a sequence of pointed and "proper" metric spaces must have a subsequence which converges. This was later reformulated by Gromov and others into the more flexible notion of an ultralimit.^{[G93]}

Gromov's compactness theorem had a deep impact on the field of geometric group theory. He applied it to understand the asymptotic geometry of the word metric of a group of polynomial growth, by taking the limit of well-chosen rescalings of the metric. By tracking the limits of isometries of the word metric, he was able to show that the limiting metric space has unexpected continuities, and in particular that its isometry group is a Lie group.^{[G81b]} As a consequence he was able to settle the Milnor-Wolf conjecture as posed in the 1960s, which asserts that any such group is virtually nilpotent. Using ultralimits, similar asymptotic structures can be studied for more general metric spaces.^{[G93]} Important developments on this topic were given by Bruce Kleiner, Bernhard Leeb, and Pierre Pansu, among others.

Another consequence is Gromov's compactness theorem, stating that the set of compact Riemannian manifolds with Ricci curvature ≥ c and diameter ≤ D is relatively compact in the Gromov–Hausdorff metric.^{[G81b]} The possible limit points of sequences of such manifolds are Alexandrov spaces of curvature ≥ c, a class of metric spaces studied in detail by Burago, Gromov and Perelman in 1992.^{[BGP92]}

Along with Eliyahu Rips, Gromov introduced the notion of hyperbolic groups.^{[G87]}

=== Symplectic geometry ===
Gromov's theory of pseudoholomorphic curves is one of the foundations of the modern study of symplectic geometry.^{[G85]} Although he was not the first to consider pseudo-holomorphic curves, he uncovered a "bubbling" phenomenon paralleling Karen Uhlenbeck's earlier work on Yang–Mills connections, and Uhlenbeck and Jonathan Sacks' work on harmonic maps. In the time since Sacks, Uhlenbeck, and Gromov's work, such bubbling phenomena have been found in a number of other geometric contexts. The corresponding compactness theorem encoding the bubbling allowed Gromov to arrive at a number of analytically deep conclusions on the existence of pseudo-holomorphic curves. A particularly famous result of Gromov's, arrived at as a consequence of the existence theory and the monotonicity formula for minimal surfaces, is the "non-squeezing theorem", which provided a striking qualitative feature of symplectic geometry. Following ideas of Edward Witten, Gromov's work is also fundamental for Gromov-Witten theory, which is a widely studied topic reaching into string theory, algebraic geometry, and symplectic geometry. From a different perspective, Gromov's work was also inspirational for much of Andreas Floer's work.

Yakov Eliashberg and Gromov developed some of the basic theory for symplectic notions of convexity.^{[EG91]} They introduce various specific notions of convexity, all of which are concerned with the existence of one-parameter families of diffeomorphisms which contract the symplectic form. They show that convexity is an appropriate context for an h-principle to hold for the problem of constructing certain symplectomorphisms. They also introduced analogous notions in contact geometry; the existence of convex contact structures was later studied by Emmanuel Giroux.

== Prizes and honors ==
=== Prizes ===
- Prize of the Mathematical Society of Moscow (1971)
- Oswald Veblen Prize in Geometry (AMS) (1981)
- Prix Élie Cartan de l'Académie des Sciences de Paris (1984)
- Prix de l'Union des Assurances de Paris (1989)
- Wolf Prize in Mathematics (1993)
- Leroy P. Steele Prize for Seminal Contribution to Research (AMS) (1997)
- Lobachevsky Medal (1997)
- Balzan Prize for Mathematics (1999)
- Kyoto Prize in Mathematical Sciences (2002)
- Nemmers Prize in Mathematics (2004)
- Bolyai Prize in 2005
- Abel Prize in 2009 "for his revolutionary contributions to geometry"

=== Honors ===
- Invited speaker to International Congress of Mathematicians: 1970 (Nice), 1978 (Helsinki), 1983 (Warsaw), 1986 (Berkeley)
- Foreign member of the National Academy of Sciences (1989), the American Academy of Arts and Sciences (1989), the Norwegian Academy of Science and Letters, the Royal Society (2011), and the National Academy of Sciences of Ukraine (2023).
- Member of the French Academy of Sciences (1997)
- Delivered the 2007 Pál Turán Memorial Lectures.

== Publications ==
Books

BGS85.	Ballmann, Werner; Gromov, Mikhael; Schroeder, Viktor (1985). Manifolds of nonpositive curvature. Progress in Mathematics. Vol. 61. Boston, MA: Birkhäuser Boston, Inc. doi:10.1007/978-1-4684-9159-3. ISBN 0-8176-3181-X. MR 0823981. Zbl 0591.53001.

G86.	Gromov, Mikhael (1986). Partial differential relations. Ergebnisse der Mathematik und ihrer Grenzgebiete (3). Vol. 9. Berlin: Springer-Verlag. doi:10.1007/978-3-662-02267-2. ISBN 3-540-12177-3. MR 0864505. Zbl 0651.53001.

G99a.	Gromov, Misha (1999). Metric structures for Riemannian and non-Riemannian spaces. Progress in Mathematics. Vol. 152. Translated by Bates, Sean Michael. With appendices by M. Katz, P. Pansu, and S. Semmes. (Based on the 1981 French original ed.). Boston, MA: Birkhäuser Boston, Inc. doi:10.1007/978-0-8176-4583-0. ISBN 0-8176-3898-9. MR 1699320. Zbl 0953.53002.

G18.	Gromov, Misha (2018). Great circle of mysteries. Mathematics, the world, the mind. Springer, Cham. doi:10.1007/978-3-319-53049-9. ISBN 978-3-319-53048-2. MR 3837512. Zbl 1433.00004.

Major articles

G69.	Gromov, M. L. (1969). "Stable mappings of foliations into manifolds". Mathematics of the USSR-Izvestiya. 33 (4): 671–694. Bibcode:1969IzMat...3..671G. doi:10.1070/im1969v003n04abeh000796. MR 0263103. Zbl 0205.53502.

G78.	Gromov, M. (1978). "Almost flat manifolds". Journal of Differential Geometry. 13 (2): 231–241. Bibcode:1978JDGeo..1334488G. doi:10.4310/jdg/1214434488. MR 0540942. Zbl 0432.53020.

GL80a.	Gromov, Mikhael; Lawson, H. Blaine Jr. (1980). "Spin and scalar curvature in the presence of a fundamental group. I". Annals of Mathematics. Second Series. 111 (2): 209–230. doi:10.2307/1971198. JSTOR 1971198. MR 0569070. S2CID 14149468. Zbl 0445.53025.

GL80b.	Gromov, Mikhael; Lawson, H. Blaine Jr. (1980). "The classification of simply connected manifolds of positive scalar curvature" (PDF). Annals of Mathematics. Second Series. 111 (3): 423–434. doi:10.2307/1971103. JSTOR 1971103. MR 0577131. Zbl 0463.53025.

G81a.	Gromov, Michael (1981). "Curvature, diameter and Betti numbers". Commentarii Mathematici Helvetici. 56 (2): 179–195. doi:10.1007/BF02566208. MR 0630949. S2CID 120818147. Zbl 0467.53021.

G81b.	Gromov, Mikhael (1981). "Groups of polynomial growth and expanding maps". Publications Mathématiques de l'Institut des Hautes Études Scientifiques. 53: 53–73. doi:10.1007/BF02698687. MR 0623534. S2CID 121512559. Zbl 0474.20018.

G81c.	Gromov, M. (1981). "Hyperbolic manifolds, groups and actions" (PDF). In Kra, Irwin; Maskit, Bernard (eds.). Riemann surfaces and related topics. Proceedings of the 1978 Stony Brook Conference (State University of New York, Stony Brook, NY, 5–9 June 1978). Annals of Mathematics Studies. Vol. 97. Princeton, NJ: Princeton University Press. pp. 183–213. doi:10.1515/9781400881550-016. ISBN 0-691-08264-2. MR 0624814. Zbl 0467.53035.

CGT82.	Cheeger, Jeff; Gromov, Mikhail; Taylor, Michael (1982). "Finite propagation speed, kernel estimates for functions of the Laplace operator, and the geometry of complete Riemannian manifolds". Journal of Differential Geometry. 17 (1): 15–53. Bibcode:1982JDGeo..1736699C. doi:10.4310/jdg/1214436699. MR 0658471. Zbl 0493.53035.

G82.	Gromov, Michael (1982). "Volume and bounded cohomology". Publications Mathématiques de l'Institut des Hautes Études Scientifiques. 56: 5–99. doi:10.5802/pmihes.3. MR 0686042. Zbl 0515.53037.

G83.	Gromov, Mikhael (1983). "Filling Riemannian manifolds". Journal of Differential Geometry. 18 (1): 1–147. Bibcode:1983JDGeo..1809283G. doi:10.4310/jdg/1214509283. MR 0697984. Zbl 0515.53037.

GL83.	Gromov, Mikhael; Lawson, H. Blaine Jr. (1983). "Positive scalar curvature and the Dirac operator on complete Riemannian manifolds". Publications Mathématiques de l'Institut des Hautes Études Scientifiques. 58: 83–196. doi:10.1007/BF02953774. MR 0720933. S2CID 123212001. Zbl 0538.53047.

GM83.	Gromov, M.; Milman, V. D. (1983). "A topological application of the isoperimetric inequality" (PDF). American Journal of Mathematics. 105 (4): 843–854. doi:10.2307/2374298. JSTOR 2374298. MR 0708367. Zbl 0522.53039.

G85.	Gromov, M. (1985). "Pseudo holomorphic curves in symplectic manifolds". Inventiones Mathematicae. 82 (2): 307–347. Bibcode:1985InMat..82..307G. doi:10.1007/BF01388806. MR 0809718. S2CID 4983969. Zbl 0592.53025.

CG86a.	Cheeger, Jeff; Gromov, Mikhael (1986). "Collapsing Riemannian manifolds while keeping their curvature bounded. I". Journal of Differential Geometry. 23 (3): 309–346. Bibcode:1986JDGeo..2340117C. doi:10.4310/jdg/1214440117. MR 0852159. Zbl 0606.53028.

CG86b.	Cheeger, Jeff; Gromov, Mikhael (1986). "L^{2}-cohomology and group cohomology". Topology. 25 (2): 189–215. doi:10.1016/0040-9383(86)90039-X. MR 0837621. Zbl 0597.57020.

G87.	Gromov, M. (1987). "Hyperbolic groups" (PDF). In Gersten, S. M. (ed.). Essays in group theory. Mathematical Sciences Research Institute Publications. Vol. 8. New York: Springer-Verlag. pp. 75–263. doi:10.1007/978-1-4613-9586-7. ISBN 0-387-96618-8. MR 0919829. Zbl 0634.20015.

G89.	Gromov, M. (1989). "Oka's principle for holomorphic sections of elliptic bundles". Journal of the American Mathematical Society. 2 (4): 851–897. doi:10.1090/S0894-0347-1989-1001851-9. MR 1001851. Zbl 0686.32012.

EG91.	Eliashberg, Yakov; Gromov, Mikhael (1991). "Convex symplectic manifolds" (PDF). In Bedford, Eric; D'Angelo, John P.; Greene, Robert E.; Krantz, Steven G. (eds.). Several complex variables and complex geometry. Part 2. Proceedings of the Thirty-Seventh Annual Summer Research Institute held at the University of California (Santa Cruz, CA, 10–30 July 1989). Proceedings of Symposia in Pure Mathematics. Vol. 52. Providence, RI: American Mathematical Society. pp. 135–162. doi:10.1090/pspum/052.2. ISBN 0-8218-1490-7. MR 1128541. Zbl 0742.53010.

G91.	Gromov, M. (1991). "Kähler hyperbolicity and L^{2}-Hodge theory". Journal of Differential Geometry. 33 (1): 263–292. Bibcode:1991JDGeo..3346039G. doi:10.4310/jdg/1214446039. MR 1085144. Zbl 0719.53042.

BGP92.	Burago, Yu.; Gromov, M.; Perelʹman, G. (1992). "A. D. Aleksandrov spaces with curvatures bounded below". Russian Mathematical Surveys. 47 (2): 1–58. Bibcode:1992RuMaS..47....1B. doi:10.1070/RM1992v047n02ABEH000877. MR 1185284. S2CID 10675933. Zbl 0802.53018.

GS92.	Gromov, Mikhail; Schoen, Richard (1992). "Harmonic maps into singular spaces and p-adic superrigidity for lattices in groups of rank one". Publications Mathématiques de l'Institut des Hautes Études Scientifiques. 76: 165–246. doi:10.1007/bf02699433. MR 1215595. S2CID 118023776. Zbl 0896.58024.

G93.	Gromov, M. (1993). "Asymptotic invariants of infinite groups" (PDF). In Niblo, Graham A.; Roller, Martin A. (eds.). Geometric group theory. Vol. 2. Symposium held at Sussex University (Sussex, July 1991). London Mathematical Society Lecture Note Series. Cambridge: Cambridge University Press. pp. 1–295. ISBN 0-521-44680-5. MR 1253544. Zbl 0841.20039.

G96.	Gromov, Mikhael (1996). "Carnot-Carathéodory spaces seen from within" (PDF). In Bellaïche, André; Risler, Jean-Jacques (eds.). Sub-Riemannian geometry. Progress in Mathematics. Vol. 144. Basel: Birkhäuser. pp. 79–323. doi:10.1007/978-3-0348-9210-0_2. ISBN 3-7643-5476-3. MR 1421823. Zbl 0864.53025.

G99b.	Gromov, M. (1999). "Endomorphisms of symbolic algebraic varieties". Journal of the European Mathematical Society. 1 (2): 109–197. doi:10.1007/PL00011162. MR 1694588. Zbl 0998.14001.

G00.	Gromov, Misha (2000). "Spaces and questions" (PDF). In Alon, N.; Bourgain, J.; Connes, A.; Gromov, M.; Milman, V. (eds.). Visions in mathematics: GAFA 2000 Special Volume, Part I. Proceedings of the meeting held at Tel Aviv University, Tel Aviv, 25 August – 3 September 1999. Geometric and Functional Analysis. Basel: Birkhäuser. pp. 118–161. doi:10.1007/978-3-0346-0422-2_5. ISBN 978-3-0346-0421-5. MR 1826251. Zbl 1006.53035.

G03a.
Gromov, M. (2003). "Isoperimetry of waists and concentration of maps". Geometric and Functional Analysis. 13 (1): 178–215. doi:10.1007/s000390300004. MR 1978494. Zbl 1044.46057. (Erratum: doi:10.1007/s00039-009-0703-1)
- See also: Memarian, Yashar (2011). "On Gromov's waist of the sphere theorem". Journal of Topology and Analysis. 3 (1): 7–36. arXiv:0911.3972. doi:10.1142/S1793525311000507. MR 2784762. S2CID 115178123. Zbl 1225.46055.

G03b.	Gromov, Mikhaïl (2003). "On the entropy of holomorphic maps" (PDF). L'Enseignement Mathématique. Revue Internationale. 2e Série. 49 (3–4): 217–235. MR 2026895. Zbl 1080.37051.

G03c.
Gromov, M. (2003). "Random walk in random groups". Geometric and Functional Analysis. 13 (1): 73–146. doi:10.1007/s000390300002. MR 1978492. Zbl 1122.20021.
- See also: Silberman, L. (2003). "Addendum to: Random walk in random groups by M. Gromov". Geometric and Functional Analysis. 13 (1): 147–177. doi:10.1007/s000390300003. MR 1978493. S2CID 120354073. Zbl 1124.20027.

== See also ==
- Cartan–Hadamard conjecture
- Cartan–Hadamard theorem
- Collapsing manifold
- Lévy–Gromov inequality
- Taubes's Gromov invariant
- Mostow rigidity theorem
- Ramsey–Dvoretzky–Milman phenomenon
- Systoles of surfaces
