= Gromov's compactness theorem =

Gromov's compactness theorem can refer to either of two mathematical theorems:

- Gromov's compactness theorem (geometry) stating that certain sets of Riemannian manifolds are relatively compact in the Gromov-Hausdorff metric
- Gromov's compactness theorem (topology) on the existence of limits of sequences of pseudoholomorphic curves
