= Berger's sphere =

In the mathematical field of Riemannian geometry, the Berger spheres form a special class of examples of Riemannian manifolds diffeomorphic to the 3-sphere. They are named for Marcel Berger who introduced them in 1962.

== Geometry of the Berger spheres ==
The Lie group SU(2) is diffeomorphic to the 3-sphere. Its Lie algebra is a three-dimensional real vector space spanned by

$$u_1 = \begin{pmatrix}
0 & i \\
i & 0
\end{pmatrix}, \quad
u_2 = \begin{pmatrix}
0 & -1 \\
1 &  0
\end{pmatrix}, \quad
u_3 = \begin{pmatrix}
i &  0 \\
0 & -i
\end{pmatrix}~,$$

which are complex multiples of the Pauli matrices. It is direct to check that the commutators are given by [u_{1}, u_{2}] = 2u_{3} and [u_{1}, u_{3}] = −2u_{2} and [u_{2}, u_{3}] = 2u_{1}. Any positive-definite inner product on the Lie algebra determines a left-invariant Riemannian metric on the Lie group. A Berger sphere is a metric so obtained by making the inner product on the Lie algebra have matrix

$$\begin{pmatrix}t&0&0\\ 0&1&0\\ 0&0&1\end{pmatrix}$$

relative to the basis u_{1}, u_{2}, u_{3}. Here t is a positive number to be freely chosen; each choice produces a different Berger sphere. If it were chosen negative, a Lorentzian metric would instead be produced. Using the Koszul formula it is direct to compute the Levi-Civita connection:

$$\begin{align}
\nabla_{u_1}u_2 &= (2-t)u_3&\nabla_{u_2}u_1&=-tu_3\\ \nabla_{u_2}u_3&=u_1& \nabla_{u_3}u_2&=-u_1\\ \nabla_{u_3}u_1&=tu_2&\nabla_{u_1}u_3&=(t-2)u_2.\end{align}$$

The curvature operator has eigenvalues t, t, 4 − 3t. The left-invariant Berger metric is also right-invariant if and only if t = 1.

The left-invariant vector field on SU(2) corresponding to u_{1} (or to any other particular element of the Lie algebra) is tangent to the circular fibers of a Hopf fibration SU(2) → S^{2}. As such, the Berger metrics can also be constructed via the Hopf fibration, by scaling the tangent directions to the fibers. Unlike the above construction, which is based on a Lie group structure on the 3-sphere, this version of the construction can be extended to the more general Hopf fibrations S^{2n + 1} → CP^{n} of odd-dimensional spheres over the complex projective spaces, using the Fubini–Study metric.

== Significance ==
A well-known inequality of Wilhelm Klingenberg says that for any smooth Riemannian metric on a closed orientable manifold of even dimension, if the sectional curvature is positive then the injectivity radius is greater than or equal to π/K^{1/2}, where K is the maximum of the sectional curvature. The Berger spheres show that this does not hold if the assumption of even-dimensionality is removed.

Likewise, another estimate of Klingenberg says that for any smooth Riemannian metric on a closed simply-connected manifold, if the sectional curvatures are all in the interval [1,4), then the injectivity radius is greater than π/2. The Berger spheres show that the assumption on sectional curvature cannot be removed.

Any compact Riemannian manifold can be scaled to produce a metric of small volume, diameter, and injectivity radius but large curvature. The Berger spheres illustrate the alternative phenomena of small volume and injectivity radius but without small diameter or large curvature. They show that the 3-sphere is a collapsing manifold: it admits a sequence of Riemannian metrics with uniformly bounded curvature but injectivity radius converging to zero. This sequence of Riemannian manifolds converges in the Gromov–Hausdorff metric to a two-dimensional sphere of constant curvature 4.

== Generalizations ==
=== Berger–Cheeger perturbations ===
The Hopf fibration S^{3} → S^{2} is a principal U(1)-bundle. Furthermore, relative to the standard Riemannian metric on S^{3}, the unit-length vector field along the fibers of the bundle form a Killing vector field. This is to say that U(1) acts by isometries.

In greater generality, consider a Lie group G acting by isometries on a Riemannian manifold (M, g). In this generality (unlike for the specific case of the Hopf fibration), different orbits of the group action might have different dimensionality. For this reason, scaling the tangent directions to the group orbits by constant factors, as for the Berger spheres, would produce discontinuities in the metric. The Berger–Cheeger perturbations modify the scaling to address this, in the following way.

Given a right-invariant Riemannian metric h on G, the product manifold G × M can be given the Riemannian metric th ⊕ g. The left action of G on this product by x⋅(y, m) = (y x^{−1}, xm) acts freely by isometries, and so there is a naturally induced Riemannian metric on the quotient space, which is naturally diffeomorphic to M.

=== Canonical variation of a Riemannian submersion ===
The Hopf fibration S^{3} → S^{2} is a Riemannian submersion relative to the standard Riemannian metrics on S^{3} and S^{2}. For any Riemannian submersion f: M → B, the canonical variation scales the vertical part of the metric by a constant factor. The Berger spheres are thus the total space of the canonical variation of the Hopf fibration. Some of the geometry of the Berger spheres generalizes to this setting. For instance, if a Riemannian submersion has totally geodesic fibers then the canonical variation also has totally geodesic fibers.
