= Minimal volume =

In mathematics, in particular in differential geometry, the minimal volume is a number that describes one aspect of a smooth manifold's topology. This diffeomorphism invariant was introduced by Mikhael Gromov.

Given a smooth Riemannian manifold (M, g), one may consider its volume vol(M, g) and sectional curvature K_{g}. The minimal volume of a smooth manifold M is defined to be:

$$\operatorname{MinVol}(M):=\inf\{\operatorname{vol}(M,g) :g\text{ a complete Riemannian metric with }|K_{g}|\leq 1\}.$$

Any closed manifold can be given an arbitrarily small volume by scaling any choice of a Riemannian metric. The minimal volume removes the possibility of such scaling by the constraint on sectional curvatures. So, if the minimal volume of M is zero, then a certain kind of nontrivial collapsing phenomena can be exhibited by Riemannian metrics on M. A trivial example, the only in which the possibility of scaling is present, is a closed flat manifold. The Berger spheres show that the minimal volume of the three-dimensional sphere is also zero. Gromov has conjectured that every closed simply connected odd-dimensional manifold has zero minimal volume.

By contrast, a positive lower bound for the minimal volume of M amounts to some (usually nontrivial) geometric inequality for the volume of an arbitrary complete Riemannian metric on M in terms of the size of its curvature. According to the Gauss-Bonnet theorem, if M is a closed and connected two-dimensional manifold, then MinVol(M) = 2π|χ(M)|. The infimum in the definition of minimal volume is realized by the metrics appearing from the uniformization theorem. More generally, according to the Chern-Gauss-Bonnet formula, if M is a closed and connected manifold then:

$$\operatorname{MinVol}(M)\geq c(n)\big|\chi(M)\big|.$$

Gromov, in 1982, showed that the volume of a complete Riemannian metric on a smooth manifold can always be estimated by the size of its curvature and by the simplicial volume of the manifold, via the inequality:

$$\operatorname{MinVol}(M)\geq\frac{\|M\|}{(n-1)^nn!}.$$
