= Collapsing manifold =

In Riemannian geometry, a collapsing or collapsed manifold is an n-dimensional manifold M that admits a sequence of Riemannian metrics g_{i}, such that as i goes to infinity the manifold is close to a k-dimensional space, where k < n, in the Gromov–Hausdorff distance sense. Generally there are some restrictions on the sectional curvatures of (M, g_{i}). The simplest example is a flat manifold, whose metric can be rescaled by 1/i, so that the manifold is close to a point, but its curvature remains 0 for all i.

== Examples ==
Generally speaking there are two types of collapsing:

(1) The first type is a collapse while keeping the curvature uniformly bounded, say $|\sec(M_i)|\le 1$.

Let $M_i$ be a sequence of $n$ dimensional Riemannian manifolds, where $\sec(M_i)$ denotes the sectional curvature of the ith manifold. There is a theorem proved by Jeff Cheeger, Kenji Fukaya and Mikhail Gromov, which states that: There exists a constant $\varepsilon(n)$ such that if $|\sec(M_i)|\le 1$ and ${\rm Inj}(M_i)<\varepsilon(n)$, then $M_i$ admits an N-structure, with ${\rm Inj}(M)$ denoting the injectivity radius of the manifold M. Roughly speaking the N-structure is a locally action of a nilmanifold, which is a generalization of an F-structure, introduced by Cheeger and Gromov. This theorem generalized previous theorems of Cheeger-Gromov and Fukaya where they only deal with the torus action and bounded diameter cases respectively.

(2) The second type is the collapsing while keeping only the lower bound of curvature, say $\sec(M_i)\ge -1$.

This is closely related to the so-called almost nonnegatively curved manifold case which generalizes non-negatively curved manifolds as well as almost flat manifolds. A manifold is said to be almost nonnegatively curved if it admits a sequence of metrics $g_i$, such that $\sec(M,g_i)\ge -1/n$ and ${\rm diam}(M,g_i)\le 1/n$. The role that an almost nonnegatively curved manifold plays in this collapsing case when curvature is bounded below is the same as an almost flat manifold plays in the curvature bounded case.

When curvature is bounded only from below, the limit space called $X$ is an Alexandrov space. Yamaguchi proved that on the regular part of the limit space, there is a locally trivial fibration form $M^n_i$ to $X$ when $i$ is sufficiently large, the fiber is an almost nonnegatively curved manifold. Here the regular means the $(\delta, n)$-strainer radius is uniformly bounded from below by a positive number, or roughly speaking, the space locally closed to the Euclidean space.

What happens at a singular point of $X$? There is no answer to this question in general. But on dimension 3, Shioya and Yamaguchi give a full classification of this type collapsed manifold. They proved that there exists a $\varepsilon(n)$ and $\delta(n)$ such that if a 3-dimensional manifold $M$ satisfies ${\rm Vol}(M)<\varepsilon(n)$ then one of the following is true: (i) M is a graph manifold or (ii) $M$ has diameter less than $\delta(n)$ and has finite fundamental group.
