= Carnot group =

In mathematics, a Carnot group (English: /kɑːrˈnoʊ/ kar-NOH, French: [kaʁno]) is a simply connected nilpotent Lie group, together with a derivation of its Lie algebra such that the subspace with eigenvalue 1 generates the Lie algebra. The subbundle of the tangent bundle associated to this eigenspace is called horizontal. On a Carnot group, any norm on the horizontal subbundle gives rise to a Carnot–Carathéodory metric. Carnot–Carathéodory metrics have metric dilations; they are asymptotic cones (see Ultralimit) of finitely-generated nilpotent groups, and of nilpotent Lie groups, as well as tangent cones of sub-Riemannian manifolds.

== Formal definition and basic properties ==
A Carnot (or stratified) group of step $k$ is a connected, simply connected, finite-dimensional Lie group whose Lie algebra $\mathfrak{g}$ admits a step-$k$ stratification. Namely, there exist nontrivial linear subspaces $V_1, \cdots, V_k$ such that

$\mathfrak{g} = V_1\oplus \cdots \oplus V_k$, $[V_1, V_i] = V_{i+1}$ for $i = 1, \cdots, k-1$, and $[V_1,V_k] = \{0\}$.

Note that this definition implies the first stratum $V_1$ generates the whole Lie algebra $\mathfrak{g}$.

The exponential map is a diffeomorphism from $\mathfrak{g}$ onto $G$. Using these exponential coordinates, we can identify $G$ with $(\mathbb{R}^n, \star)$, where $n = \dim V_1 + \cdots + \dim V_k$ and the operation $\star$ is given by the Baker–Campbell–Hausdorff formula.

Sometimes it is more convenient to write an element $z \in G$ as

$z = (z_1, \cdots, z_k)$ with $z_i \in \R^{\dim V_i}$ for $i = 1, \cdots, k$.

The reason is that $G$ has an intrinsic dilation operation $\delta_\lambda : G \to G$ given by

$$\delta_\lambda(z_1, \cdots, z_k) := (\lambda z_1, \cdots, \lambda^k z_k)$$.

== Examples ==
The real Heisenberg group is a Carnot group which can be viewed as a flat model in Sub-Riemannian geometry as Euclidean space in Riemannian geometry. The Engel group is also a Carnot group.

== History ==
Carnot groups were introduced, under that name, by Pierre Pansu (1982, 1989) and John Mitchell (1985). However, the concept was introduced earlier by Gerald Folland (1975), under the name stratified group.

== See also ==
- Pansu derivative, a derivative on a Carnot group introduced by Pansu (1989)
