= Space of directions =

In metric geometry, the space of directions at a point describes the directions of curves that start at the point. It generalizes the tangent space in a differentiable manifold.

== Definitions ==
Let (M, d) be a metric space. First we define the upper angle for two curves starting at the same point in M. So let $\alpha, \beta:[0,\varepsilon)\to M$ be two curves with $\alpha(0)=\beta(0)=p$. The upper angle between them at p is

$$\angle_U(\alpha,\beta) := \varlimsup_{s,t\to 0} \arccos \frac {d(\alpha(s),p)^2 + d(\beta(t),p)^2 - d(\alpha(s), \beta(t))^2} {2 d(\alpha(s),p) d(\beta(t),p)}.$$

The upper angle satisfies the triangle inequality: For three curves $\alpha_1, \alpha_2, \alpha_3$ starting at p,

$$\angle_U(\alpha_1,\alpha_3) \le \angle_U(\alpha_1,\alpha_2) + \angle_U(\alpha_2,\alpha_3).$$

A curve is said to have a direction if the upper angle of two copies of itself at the starting point is zero. For curves which have directions at a point, we define an equivalence relation on them by saying that two curves are equivalent if the upper angle between them at the point is zero. Two equivalent curves are said to have the same direction at the point.

The set of equivalence classes of curves with directions at the point p equipped with the upper angle is a metric space, called the space of directions at the point, denoted as $\Omega_p(M)$. The metric completion of the space of directions is called the completed space of directions, denoted as $\overline{\Omega_p(M)}$.

For an Alexandrov space with curvature bounded either above or below, there is also a similar definition in which shortest paths, which always have directions, are used. The space of directions at a point is then defined as the metric completion of the set of equivalence classes of shortest paths starting at the point.
