= Pseudoholomorphic curve =

In mathematics, specifically in topology and geometry, a pseudoholomorphic curve (or J-holomorphic curve) is a smooth map, from a Riemann surface into an almost complex manifold, that satisfies the Cauchy–Riemann equations. Introduced in 1985 by Mikhail Gromov, pseudoholomorphic curves have since revolutionized the study of symplectic manifolds. In particular, they lead to the Gromov–Witten invariants and Floer homology, and play a prominent role in string theory.

== Definition ==
Let $X$ be an almost complex manifold with almost complex structure $J$. Let $C$ be a smooth Riemann surface (also called a complex curve) with complex structure $j$. A pseudoholomorphic curve in $X$ is a map $f : C \to X$ that satisfies the Cauchy–Riemann equation

$$\bar \partial_{j, J} f := \frac{1}{2}(df + J \circ df \circ j) = 0.$$

Since $J^2 = -1$, this condition is equivalent to

$$J \circ df = df \circ j,$$

which simply means that the differential $df$ is complex-linear, that is, $J$ maps each tangent space

$$T_xf(C)\subseteq T_xX$$

to itself. For technical reasons, it is often preferable to introduce some sort of inhomogeneous term $\nu$ and to study maps satisfying the perturbed Cauchy–Riemann equation

$$\bar \partial_{j, J} f = \nu.$$

A pseudoholomorphic curve satisfying this equation can be called, more specifically, a $(j, J, \nu)$-holomorphic curve. The perturbation $\nu$ is sometimes assumed to be generated by a Hamiltonian (particularly in Floer theory), but in general it need not be.

A pseudoholomorphic curve is, by its definition, always parametrized. In applications one is often truly interested in unparametrized curves, meaning embedded (or immersed) two-submanifolds of $X$, so one mods out by reparametrizations of the domain that preserve the relevant structure. In the case of Gromov–Witten invariants, for example, we consider only closed domains $C$ of fixed genus $g$ and we introduce $n$ marked points (or punctures) on $C$. As soon as the punctured Euler characteristic $2 - 2 g - n$ is negative, there are only finitely many holomorphic reparametrizations of $C$ that preserve the marked points. The domain curve $C$ is an element of the Deligne–Mumford moduli space of curves.

== Analogy with the classical Cauchy–Riemann equations ==
The classical case occurs when $X$ and $C$ are both simply the complex number plane. In real coordinates

$$j = J = \begin{bmatrix} 0 & -1 \\ 1 & 0 \end{bmatrix},$$

and

$$df = \begin{bmatrix} \partial u/\partial x & \partial u/\partial y \\ \partial v/\partial x & \partial v/\partial y \end{bmatrix},$$

where $f(x, y) = (u(x, y), v(x, y))$. After multiplying these matrices in two different orders, one sees immediately that the equation

$$J \circ df = df \circ j$$

written above is equivalent to the classical Cauchy–Riemann equations

$$\begin{cases} \partial u/\partial x = \partial v/\partial y \\ \partial v/\partial x = -\partial u/\partial y. \end{cases}$$

== Applications in symplectic topology ==
Although they can be defined for any almost complex manifold, pseudoholomorphic curves are especially interesting when $J$ interacts with a symplectic form $\omega$. An almost complex structure $J$ is said to be $\omega$-tame if and only if

$$\omega(v, J v) > 0$$

for all nonzero tangent vectors $v$. Tameness implies that the formula

$$(u, v) = \frac{1}{2}\left(\omega(u, Jv) + \omega(v, Ju)\right)$$

defines a Riemannian metric on $X$. Gromov showed that, for a given $\omega$, the space of $\omega$-tame $J$ is nonempty and contractible. Gromov used this theory to prove a non-squeezing theorem concerning symplectic embeddings of spheres into cylinders.

Gromov showed that certain moduli spaces of pseudoholomorphic curves (satisfying additional specified conditions) are compact, and described the way in which pseudoholomorphic curves can degenerate when only finite energy is assumed. (The finite energy condition holds most notably for curves with a fixed homology class in a symplectic manifold where J is $\omega$-tame or $\omega$-compatible). This Gromov compactness theorem, now greatly generalized using stable maps, makes possible the definition of Gromov–Witten invariants, which count pseudoholomorphic curves in symplectic manifolds.

Compact moduli spaces of pseudoholomorphic curves are also used to construct Floer homology, which Andreas Floer (and later authors, in greater generality) used to prove the famous conjecture of Vladimir Arnol'd concerning the number of fixed points of Hamiltonian flows.

== Applications in physics ==
In type II string theory, one considers surfaces traced out by strings as they travel along paths in a Calabi–Yau 3-fold. Following the path integral formulation of quantum mechanics, one wishes to compute certain integrals over the space of all such surfaces. Because such a space is infinite-dimensional, these path integrals are not mathematically well-defined in general. However, under the A-twist one can deduce that the surfaces are parametrized by pseudoholomorphic curves, and so the path integrals reduce to integrals over moduli spaces of pseudoholomorphic curves (or rather stable maps), which are finite-dimensional. In closed type IIA string theory, for example, these integrals are precisely the Gromov–Witten invariants.

== See also ==
- Holomorphic curve
