= Iwasawa =

Iwasawa may refer to:

== People ==
- Kenkichi Iwasawa (岩澤 健吉; 1917–1998), Japanese mathematician
- Yuji Iwasawa (岩沢 雄司; born 1954), Japanese jurist
- Yugo Iwasawa (岩澤 優吾; born 2001), Japanese racing driver

== Mathematics ==
- Iwasawa decomposition, a mathematical group decomposition
- Iwasawa group, a mathematical group whose subgroup lattice is modular
- Iwasawa manifold, a mathematical six-dimensional space

== Others ==
- Iwasawa Station, railway station
- Masami Iwasawa (岩沢 まさみ), a character from the anime, Angel Beats!
