= Pansu derivative =

In mathematics, the Pansu derivative is a derivative on a Carnot group, introduced by Pierre Pansu (1989). A Carnot group $G$ admits a one-parameter family of dilations, $\delta_s\colon G\to G$. If $G_1$ and $G_2$ are Carnot groups, then the Pansu derivative of a function $f\colon G_1\to G_2$ at a point $x\in G_1$ is the function $Df(x)\colon G_1\to G_2$ defined by

$$Df(x)(y) = \lim_{s\to 0}\delta_{1/s} (f(x)^{-1}f(x\delta_sy))\, ,$$

provided that this limit exists.

A key theorem in this area is the Pansu–Rademacher theorem, a generalization of Rademacher's theorem, which can be stated as follows: Lipschitz continuous functions between (measurable subsets of) Carnot groups are Pansu differentiable almost everywhere.
