= Alexandrov space =

Geometry concept

In differential geometry, Alexandrov spaces with curvature ≥ k form a generalization of Riemannian manifolds with sectional curvature ≥ k, where k is some real number. By definition, these spaces are locally compact complete length spaces where the lower curvature bound is defined via comparison of geodesic triangles in the space to geodesic triangles in standard constant-curvature Riemannian surfaces.

One can show that the Hausdorff dimension of an Alexandrov space with curvature ≥ k is either a non-negative integer or infinite. One can define a notion of "angle" (see Comparison triangle#Alexandrov angles) and "tangent cone" in these spaces.

Alexandrov spaces with curvature ≥ k are important as they form the limits (in the Gromov–Hausdorff metric) of sequences of Riemannian manifolds with sectional curvature ≥ k, as described by Gromov's compactness theorem.

Alexandrov spaces with curvature ≥ k were introduced by the Russian mathematician Aleksandr Danilovich Aleksandrov in 1948 and should not be confused with Alexandrov-discrete spaces named after the Russian topologist Pavel Alexandrov. They were studied in detail by Burago, Gromov and Perelman in 1992 and were later used in Perelman's proof of the Poincaré conjecture.
