= Solvmanifold =

In mathematics, a solvmanifold is a homogeneous space of a connected solvable Lie group. It may also be characterized as a quotient of a connected solvable Lie group by a closed subgroup. (Some authors also require that the Lie group be simply-connected, or that the quotient be compact.) A special class of solvmanifolds, nilmanifolds, was introduced by Anatoly Maltsev, who proved the first structural theorems. Properties of general solvmanifolds are similar, but somewhat more complicated.

== Examples ==
- A solvable Lie group is trivially a solvmanifold.
- Every nilpotent group is solvable, therefore, every nilmanifold is a solvmanifold. This class of examples includes n-dimensional tori and the quotient of the 3-dimensional real Heisenberg group by its integral Heisenberg subgroup.
- The Möbius band and the Klein bottle are solvmanifolds that are not nilmanifolds.
- The mapping torus of an Anosov diffeomorphism of the n-torus is a solvmanifold. For $n=2$, these manifolds belong to Sol, one of the eight Thurston geometries.

== Properties ==
- A solvmanifold is diffeomorphic to the total space of a vector bundle over some compact solvmanifold. This statement was conjectured by George Mostow and proved by Louis Auslander and Richard Tolimieri.
- The fundamental group of an arbitrary solvmanifold is polycyclic.
- A compact solvmanifold is determined up to diffeomorphism by its fundamental group.
- Fundamental groups of compact solvmanifolds may be characterized as group extensions of free abelian groups of finite rank by finitely generated torsion-free nilpotent groups.
- Every solvmanifold is aspherical. Among all compact homogeneous spaces, solvmanifolds may be characterized by the properties of being aspherical and having a solvable fundamental group.

== Completeness ==
Let $\mathfrak{g}$ be a real Lie algebra. It is called a complete Lie algebra if each map

$$\operatorname{ad}(X)\colon \mathfrak{g} \to \mathfrak{g}, X \in \mathfrak{g}$$

in its adjoint representation is hyperbolic, i.e., it has only real eigenvalues. Let G be a solvable Lie group whose Lie algebra $\mathfrak{g}$ is complete. Then for any closed subgroup $\Gamma$ of G, the solvmanifold $G/\Gamma$ is a complete solvmanifold.
