= Rademacher's theorem =

Mathematical theorem

In mathematical analysis, Rademacher's theorem, named after Hans Rademacher, states the following: If U is an open subset of R^{n} and f: U → R^{m} is locally Lipschitz continuous, then f is differentiable almost everywhere in U; that is, the points in U at which f is not differentiable form a set of Lebesgue measure zero. Differentiability here refers to infinitesimal approximability by a linear map, which in particular asserts the existence of the coordinate-wise partial derivatives.

== Sketch of proof ==
The one-dimensional case of Rademacher's theorem is a standard result in introductory texts on measure-theoretic analysis. In this context, it is natural to prove the more general statement that any single-variable function of bounded variation is differentiable almost everywhere. (This one-dimensional generalization of Rademacher's theorem fails to extend to higher dimensions.)

One of the standard proofs of the general Rademacher theorem was found by Charles Morrey. In the following, let u denote a Lipschitz-continuous function on R^{n}. The first step of the proof is to show that, for any fixed unit vector v, the v-directional derivative of u exists almost everywhere. This is a consequence of a special case of the Fubini theorem: a measurable set in R^{n} has Lebesgue measure zero if its restriction to every line parallel to v has (one-dimensional) Lebesgue measure zero. Considering in particular the set in R^{n} where the v-directional derivative of u fails to exist (which must be proved to be measurable), the latter condition is met due to the one-dimensional case of Rademacher's theorem.

The second step of Morrey's proof establishes the linear dependence of the v-directional derivative of u upon v. This is based upon the following identity:

$$\int_{\mathbf{R}^n}\frac{u(x+h\nu)-u(x)}{h}\zeta(x)\,d\mathcal{L}^n(x)=-\int_{\mathbf{R}^n}\frac{\zeta(x)-\zeta(x-h\nu)}{h}u(x)\,d\mathcal{L}^n(x).$$

Using the Lipschitz assumption on u, the dominated convergence theorem can be applied to replace the two difference quotients in the above expression by the corresponding v-directional derivatives. Then, based upon the known linear dependence of the v-directional derivative of ζ upon v, the same can be proved of u via the fundamental lemma of calculus of variations.

At this point in the proof, the gradient (defined as the n-tuple of partial derivatives) is guaranteed to exist almost everywhere; for each v, the dot product with v equals the v-directional derivative almost everywhere (although perhaps on a smaller set). Hence, for any countable collection of unit vectors v_{1}, v_{2}, ..., there is a single set E of measure zero such that the gradient and each v_{i}-directional derivative exist everywhere on the complement of E, and are linked by the dot product. By selecting v_{1}, v_{2}, ... to be dense in the unit sphere, it is possible to use the Lipschitz condition and appropriate $\varepsilon$-nets on the sphere to show the total derivative exists everywhere on E.

The case where U ≠ R^{n} can be recovered by replacing f by

$\tilde f(x) = \inf_{y \in U} f(y) + K \|x-y\|,$

where K is a Lipschitz constant for f. The locally Lipschitz case can be deduced from the Lipschitz case by the fact that U is Lindelöf.

Morrey's proof can also be put into the context of generalized derivatives. Another proof, also via a reduction to the one-dimensional case, uses the technology of approximate limits.

== Applications ==
Rademacher's theorem can be used to prove that, for any p ≥ 1, the Sobolev space W^{1,p}(Ω) is preserved under a bi-Lipschitz transformation of the domain, with the chain rule holding in its standard form. With appropriate modification, this also extends to the more general Sobolev spaces W^{k,p}(Ω).

Rademacher's theorem is also significant in the study of geometric measure theory and rectifiable sets, as it allows the analysis of first-order differential geometry, specifically tangent planes and normal vectors. Higher-order concepts such as curvature remain more subtle, since their usual definitions require more differentiability than is achieved by the Rademacher theorem. In the presence of convexity, second-order differentiability is achieved by the Alexandrov theorem, the proof of which can be modeled on that of the Rademacher theorem. In some special cases, the Rademacher theorem is even used as part of the proof.

== Generalizations ==
Alberto Calderón proved the more general fact that if Ω is an open bounded set in R^{n} then every function in the Sobolev space W^{1,p}(Ω) is differentiable almost everywhere, provided that p > n. Calderón's theorem is a relatively direct corollary of the Lebesgue differentiation theorem and Sobolev embedding theorem. Rademacher's theorem is a special case, due to the fact that any Lipschitz function on Ω is an element of the space W^{1,∞}(Ω).

There is a version of Rademacher's theorem that holds for Lipschitz functions from a Euclidean space into an arbitrary metric space in terms of metric differentials instead of the usual derivative.

== See also ==
- Pansu derivative
