= Mal'cev's criterion =

Theorem for nilmanifolds

In differential geometry, Mal'cev's criterion, proved by Anatoly Mal'cev, states that a simply connected nilpotent Lie group admits a lattice, i.e., a discrete co-compact subgroup, if and only if the associated Lie algebra admits a basis such that the structure constants are rational.

The relevance of Mal'cev's criterion comes from the fact that it gives us a one-to-one correspondence between isomorphism classes of Lie algebras with rational structure constants and compact nilmanifolds. Indeed, Mal'cev showed that compact nilmanifolds are precisely quotients of simply connected nilpotent Lie groups by a lattice.

== Relevance in Kähler geometry ==
Mal'cev's criterion is relevant in Kähler geometry because compact nilmanifolds with a Kähler structure must be diffeomorphic to a torus. Therefore, when looking for manifolds that do not admit a Kähler structure, one may use Mal'cev's criterion to generate a compact nilmanifold from any rational Lie algebra. By constructing other structures on the manifold, such as a complex or symplectic structure, one finds a non-Kähler manifold of said structure. It therefore helps finding solutions to the Thurston–Weinstein problem, which concerns itself with the existence of non-Kähler symplectic manifolds.
