= Alexandrov theorem =

In mathematical analysis, the Alexandrov theorem, named after Aleksandr Danilovich Aleksandrov, states that if U is an open subset of $\R^n$ and $f\colon U\to \R^m$ is a convex function, then $f$ has a second derivative almost everywhere.

In this context, having a second derivative at a point means having a second-order Taylor expansion at that point with a local error smaller than any quadratic.

The result is closely related to Rademacher's theorem.
