= Metric Structures for Riemannian and Non-Riemannian Spaces =

Book by Michail Gromov

- Author: Mikhail Gromov
- Original title: Structures métriques pour les variétés riemanniennes
- Translator: Sean Michael Bates
- Language: English
- Subject: Mathematics
- Genre: Non-fiction
- Publisher: Birkhäuser Boston
- Publication date: 1999
- Publication place: United States
- Media type: Print
- Pages: xx+585 pp
- ISBN: 0-8176-3898-9

Metric Structures for Riemannian and Non-Riemannian Spaces is a book in geometry by Mikhail Gromov. It was originally published in French in 1981 under the title Structures métriques pour les variétés riemanniennes, by CEDIC (Paris).

== History ==
The 1981 edition was edited by Jacques Lafontaine and Pierre Pansu. The English version, considerably expanded, was published in 1999 by Birkhäuser Verlag, with appendices by Pierre Pansu, Stephen Semmes, and Mikhail Katz. The book was well received and has been reprinted several times.
