= 2π theorem =

Mathematical theorem

In mathematics, the 2π theorem of Gromov and Thurston states a sufficient condition for Dehn filling on a cusped hyperbolic 3-manifold to result in a negatively curved 3-manifold.

== Background and statement ==
Let M be a cusped hyperbolic 3-manifold. Disjoint horoball neighborhoods of each cusp can be selected. The boundaries of these neighborhoods are quotients of horospheres and thus have Euclidean metrics. A slope, i.e. unoriented isotopy class of simple closed curves on these boundaries, thus has a well-defined length by taking the minimal Euclidean length over all curves in the isotopy class. The 2π theorem states: a Dehn filling of M with each filling slope greater than 2π results in a 3-manifold with a complete metric of negative sectional curvature. In fact, this metric can be selected to be identical to the original hyperbolic metric outside the horoball neighborhoods.

== Proof idea ==
The basic idea of the proof is to explicitly construct a negatively curved metric inside each horoball neighborhood that matches the metric near the horospherical boundary. This construction, using cylindrical coordinates, works when the filling slope is greater than 2π.

== Related results ==
According to the geometrization conjecture, these negatively curved 3-manifolds must actually admit a complete hyperbolic metric. A horoball packing argument due to Thurston shows that there are at most 48 slopes to avoid on each cusp to get a hyperbolic 3-manifold. For one-cusped hyperbolic 3-manifolds, an improvement due to Colin Adams gives 24 exceptional slopes.

In 2000, this result was improved independently with the 6 theorem. The "6 theorem" states that Dehn filling along slopes of length greater than 6 results in a hyperbolike 3-manifold, i.e. an irreducible, atoroidal, non-Seifert-fibered 3-manifold with infinite word hyperbolic fundamental group. Yet again assuming the geometrization conjecture, these manifolds have a complete hyperbolic metric. An argument of Agol's shows that there are at most 12 exceptional slopes.
