= Iwasawa manifold =

In mathematics, in the field of differential geometry, an Iwasawa manifold is a compact quotient of a 3-dimensional complex Heisenberg group by a cocompact, discrete subgroup. An Iwasawa manifold is a nilmanifold, of real dimension 6.

Iwasawa manifolds give examples where the first two terms E_{1} and E_{2} of the Frölicher spectral sequence are not isomorphic.

As a complex manifold, such an Iwasawa manifold is an important example of a compact complex manifold which does not admit any Kähler metric.
