= Pierre Pansu =

French mathematician

- Born: 13 July 1959 (age 67); Lyon, France
- Education: École Normale Supérieure
- Scientific career
- Fields: Mathematics
- Workplaces: École Normale Supérieure; Université Paris-Sud 11
- Thesis: Géométrie du groupe de Heisenberg (1982)
- Doctoral advisor: Marcel Berger
- Other academic advisors: Mikhail Gromov
- Doctoral students: Cornelia Druțu

Pierre Pansu (born 13 July 1959) is a French mathematician and a member of the Arthur Besse group and a close collaborator of Mikhail Gromov. He is a professor at the Université Paris-Sud 11 and the École Normale Supérieure in Paris. His main research field is geometry. His contribution to mathematics was celebrated by a double event (a conference and a workshop) co-organized for his 60th birthday by the Clay Mathematics Institute.

Pierre Pansu is the grandson of French physician Félix Esclangon, and the great grand-nephew of mathematician and astronomer Ernest Esclangon, inventor of the talking clock, and brother of Robert Pansu, chemist and research director at CNRS.

== See also ==
- Metric Structures for Riemannian and Non-Riemannian Spaces
- Pansu derivative
