= Myers's theorem =

Bounds the length of geodetic segments in Riemannian manifolds based in Ricci curvature

Myers's theorem, also known as the Bonnet–Myers theorem, is a celebrated, fundamental theorem in the mathematical field of Riemannian geometry. It was discovered by Sumner Byron Myers in 1941. It asserts the following:

Let $(M, g)$ be a complete and connected Riemannian manifold of dimension $n$ whose Ricci curvature satisfies for some fixed positive real number $r$ the inequality $\operatorname{Ric}_{p}(v)\geq (n-1)\frac{1}{r^2}$ for every $p\in M$ and $v\in T_{p}M$ of unit length. Then any two points of $M$ can be joined by a geodesic segment of length at most $\pi r$.

In the special case of surfaces, this result was proved by Ossian Bonnet in 1855. For a surface, the Gauss, sectional, and Ricci curvatures are all the same, but Bonnet's proof easily generalizes to higher dimensions if one assumes a positive lower bound on the sectional curvature. Myers' key contribution was therefore to show that a Ricci lower bound is all that is needed to reach the same conclusion.

== Corollaries ==
The conclusion of the theorem says, in particular, that the diameter of $(M, g)$ is finite. Therefore $M$ must be compact, as a closed (and hence compact) ball of finite radius in any tangent space is carried onto all of $M$ by the exponential map.

As a very particular case, this shows that any complete and noncompact smooth Einstein manifold must have nonpositive Einstein constant.

Since $M$ is connected, there exists the smooth universal covering map $\pi : N \to M.$ One may consider the pull-back metric $\pi^*g$ on $N.$ Since $\pi$ is a local isometry, Myers' theorem applies to the Riemannian manifold $(N,\pi^*g)$ and hence $N$ is compact and the covering map is finite. This implies that the fundamental group of $M$ is finite.

== Cheng's diameter rigidity theorem ==
The conclusion of Myers' theorem says that for any $p, q \in M,$ one has $d_g(p,q)\leq\frac{\pi}{\sqrt{k}}$. In 1975, Shiu-Yuen Cheng proved:

Let $(M, g)$ be a complete and smooth Riemannian manifold of dimension n. If k is a positive number with Ric^{g} ≥ (n-1)k, and if there exists p and q in M with $d_g(p,q)=\frac{\pi}{\sqrt{k}}$, then $(M,g)$ is simply-connected and has constant sectional curvature k.

== See also ==
- Gromov's compactness theorem (geometry) – On when a set of compact Riemannian manifolds of a given dimension is relatively compact
