= Riemannian geometry =

Branch of differential geometry

Riemannian geometry is the branch of differential geometry that studies Riemannian manifolds. An example of a Riemannian manifold is a surface, on which distances are measured by the length of curves on the surface. Riemannian geometry is the study of surfaces and their higher-dimensional analogs (called manifolds), in which distances are calculated along curves belonging to the manifold. Formally, Riemannian geometry is the study of smooth manifolds with a Riemannian metric (an inner product on the tangent space at each point that varies smoothly from point to point). This gives, in particular, local notions of angle, length of curves, surface area and volume. From those, some other global quantities can be derived by integrating local contributions.

Riemannian geometry originated with the vision of Bernhard Riemann expressed in his inaugural lecture "Über die Hypothesen, welche der Geometrie zu Grunde liegen" ("On the Hypotheses on which Geometry is Based"). It is a very broad and abstract generalization of the differential geometry of surfaces in R^{3}. Development of Riemannian geometry resulted in synthesis of diverse results concerning the geometry of surfaces and the behavior of geodesics on them, with techniques that can be applied to the study of differentiable manifolds of higher dimensions. It enabled the formulation of Einstein's general theory of relativity, made profound impact on group theory and representation theory, as well as analysis, and spurred the development of algebraic and differential topology.

== Introduction ==
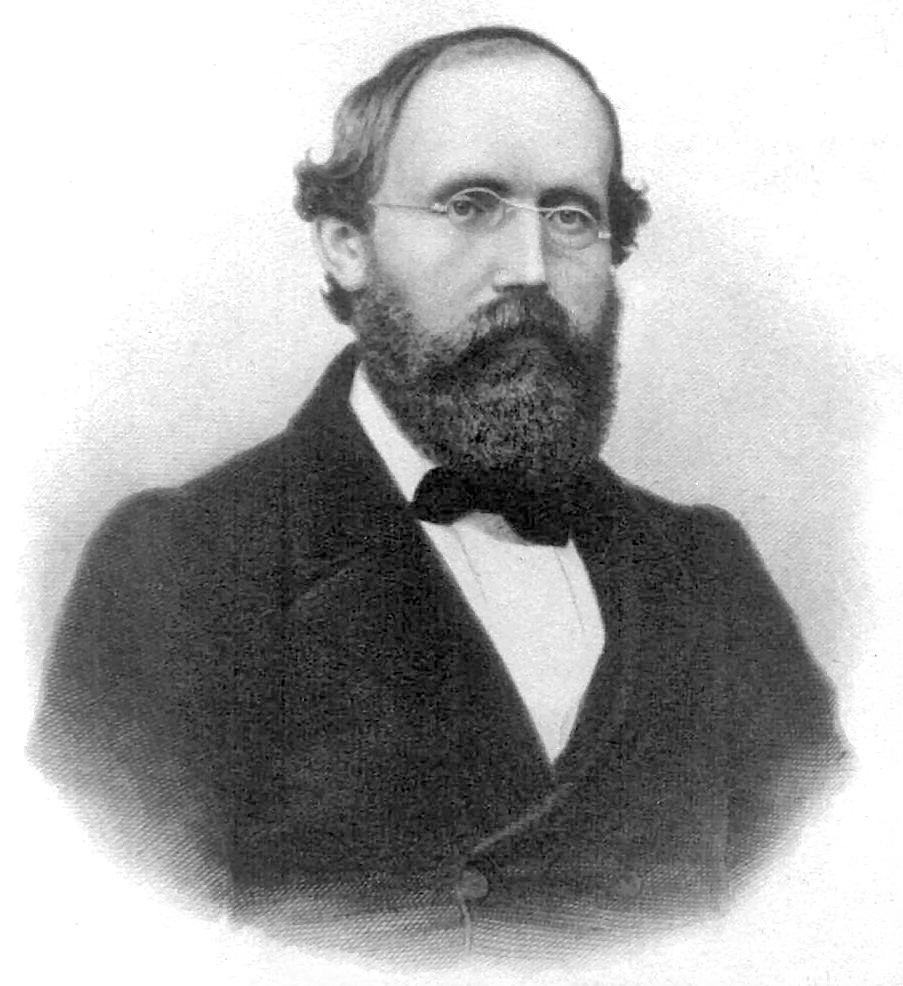
Bernhard Riemann

Riemannian geometry was first put forward in generality by Bernhard Riemann in the 19th century. It deals with a broad range of geometries whose metric properties vary from point to point, including the standard types of non-Euclidean geometry. The main idea is that a space, like a surface in Euclidean space, carries what is known as a Riemannian metric, which arises by restricting the ambient dot product to vectors that are tangent to the surface. Riemann realized that the essential ingredient here was this quadratic form on tangent vectors, and that it could be generalized. The important thing, the intrinsic way that paths in the surface could be measured, was not how the surface sat in space, but how this quadratic form varied from point to point. Consider the simple case of a cylinder: a flat piece of paper can be wrapped into a cylinder, but the "intrinsic distance", that is the distance that an insect must crawl to get from one point to another, is not changed by the warping of a flat paper into three dimensions. A more advanced example, known to Riemann, was that the helicoid could (after cutting along a generator) be deformed to a catenoid without altering the intrinsic geometry (what an ant sees).

Deformation of a right-handed helicoid into a left-handed one and back again via a catenoid, preserving this intrinsic metric (length of sides of mesh)

Riemann's idea was that it was the quadratic form which matters most, rather than the particular way a surface might be realized in space (a cylinder versus a piece of paper, for example). Riemannian geometry thus studies the intrinsic geometry of a manifold, equipped with a quadratic form on tangent vectors at every point. An important idea is that manifolds, unlike surfaces, need not be described as embedded in any particular Euclidean space: they may be described in local coordinate patches. In each coordinate patch, the metric has one expression, and when going to another patch, the metric changes by well-defined rules (essentially the chain rule).

A modern theorem is that every smooth manifold admits a Riemannian metric (in fact, many Riemannian metrics). The properties of such metrics are useful to constrain the topology of the original manifold.

In Riemannian geometry, as in Euclidean geometry, the quadratic form is positive definite. Relaxing this condition, and allowing that some non-zero vectors can be null under the quadratic form allows the structure of pseudo-Riemannian manifolds, which (in four dimensions) are the main objects of the theory of general relativity. On the other hand, replacing the quadratic form by a more general non-quadratic function leads to Finsler geometry.

There exists a close analogy of differential geometry with the mathematical structure of defects in regular crystals. Dislocations and disclinations produce torsions and curvature.

The following articles provide some useful introductory material:

- Metric tensor
- Riemannian manifold
- Levi-Civita connection
- Curvature
- Riemann curvature tensor
- List of differential geometry topics
- Glossary of Riemannian and metric geometry

== Classical theorems ==
What follows is an incomplete list of the most classical theorems in Riemannian geometry. The choice is made depending on its importance and elegance of formulation. Most of the results can be found in the classic monograph by Jeff Cheeger and D. Ebin (see below).

The formulations given are far from being very exact or the most general. This list is oriented to those who already know the basic definitions and want to know what these definitions are about.

=== General theorems ===
1. Gauss–Bonnet theorem The integral of the Gauss curvature on a compact 2-dimensional Riemannian manifold is equal to 2πχ(M) where χ(M) denotes the Euler characteristic of M. This theorem has a generalization to any compact even-dimensional Riemannian manifold, see generalized Gauss-Bonnet theorem.
2. Nash embedding theorems. They state that every Riemannian manifold can be isometrically embedded in a Euclidean space R^{n}.

=== Geometry in large ===
In all of the following theorems we assume some local behavior of the space (usually formulated using curvature assumption) to derive some information about the global structure of the space, including either some information on the topological type of the manifold or on the behavior of points at "sufficiently large" distances.

==== Pinched sectional curvature ====
1. Sphere theorem. If M is a simply connected compact n-dimensional Riemannian manifold with sectional curvature strictly pinched between 1/4 and 1 then M is diffeomorphic to a sphere.
2. Cheeger's finiteness theorem. Given constants C, D and V, there are only finitely many (up to diffeomorphism) compact n-dimensional Riemannian manifolds with sectional curvature |K| ≤ C, diameter ≤ D and volume ≥ V.
3. Gromov's almost flat manifolds. There is an ε_{n} > 0 such that if an n-dimensional Riemannian manifold has a metric with sectional curvature |K| ≤ ε_{n} and diameter ≤ 1 then its finite cover is diffeomorphic to a nil manifold.

==== Sectional curvature bounded below ====
1. Cheeger–Gromoll's soul theorem. If M is a non-compact complete non-negatively curved n-dimensional Riemannian manifold, then M contains a compact, totally geodesic submanifold S such that M is diffeomorphic to the normal bundle of S (S is called the soul of M.) In particular, if M has strictly positive curvature everywhere, then it is diffeomorphic to R^{n}. G. Perelman in 1994 gave an astonishingly elegant/short proof of the Soul Conjecture: M is diffeomorphic to R^{n} if it has positive curvature at only one point.
2. Gromov's Betti number theorem. There is a constant C = C(n) such that if M is a compact connected n-dimensional Riemannian manifold with positive sectional curvature then the sum of its Betti numbers is at most C.
3. Grove–Petersen's finiteness theorem. Given constants C, D and V, there are only finitely many homotopy types of compact n-dimensional Riemannian manifolds with sectional curvature K ≥ C, diameter ≤ D and volume ≥ V.

==== Sectional curvature bounded above ====
1. The Cartan–Hadamard theorem states that a complete simply connected Riemannian manifold M with nonpositive sectional curvature is diffeomorphic to the Euclidean space R^{n} with n = dim M via the exponential map at any point. It implies that any two points of a simply connected complete Riemannian manifold with nonpositive sectional curvature are joined by a unique geodesic.
2. The geodesic flow of any compact Riemannian manifold with negative sectional curvature is ergodic.
3. If M is a complete Riemannian manifold with sectional curvature bounded above by a strictly negative constant k then it is a CAT(k) space. Consequently, its fundamental group Γ = π_{1}(M) is Gromov hyperbolic. This has many implications for the structure of the fundamental group:

- it is finitely presented;
- the word problem for Γ has a positive solution;
- the group Γ has finite virtual cohomological dimension;
- it contains only finitely many conjugacy classes of elements of finite order;
- the abelian subgroups of Γ are virtually cyclic, so that it does not contain a subgroup isomorphic to Z×Z.

==== Ricci curvature bounded below ====
1. Myers theorem. If a complete Riemannian manifold has positive Ricci curvature then its fundamental group is finite.
2. Bochner's formula. If a compact Riemannian n-manifold has non-negative Ricci curvature, then its first Betti number is at most n, with equality if and only if the Riemannian manifold is a flat torus.
3. Splitting theorem. If a complete n-dimensional Riemannian manifold has nonnegative Ricci curvature and a straight line (i.e. a geodesic that minimizes distance on each interval) then it is isometric to a direct product of the real line and a complete (n-1)-dimensional Riemannian manifold that has nonnegative Ricci curvature.
4. Bishop–Gromov inequality. The volume of a metric ball of radius r in a complete n-dimensional Riemannian manifold with positive Ricci curvature has volume at most that of the volume of a ball of the same radius r in Euclidean space.
5. Gromov's compactness theorem. The set of all Riemannian manifolds with positive Ricci curvature and diameter at most D is pre-compact in the Gromov-Hausdorff metric.

==== Negative Ricci curvature ====
1. The isometry group of a compact Riemannian manifold with negative Ricci curvature is discrete.
2. Any smooth manifold of dimension n ≥ 3 admits a Riemannian metric with negative Ricci curvature. (This is not true for surfaces.)

==== Positive scalar curvature ====
1. The n-dimensional torus does not admit a metric with positive scalar curvature.
2. If the injectivity radius of a compact n-dimensional Riemannian manifold is ≥ π then the average scalar curvature is at most n(n-1).
