= Gromov–Hausdorff convergence =

Notion for convergence of metric spaces

In mathematics, Gromov–Hausdorff convergence, named after Mikhail Gromov and Felix Hausdorff, is a notion for convergence of metric spaces which is a generalization of Hausdorff distance.

== Gromov–Hausdorff distance ==
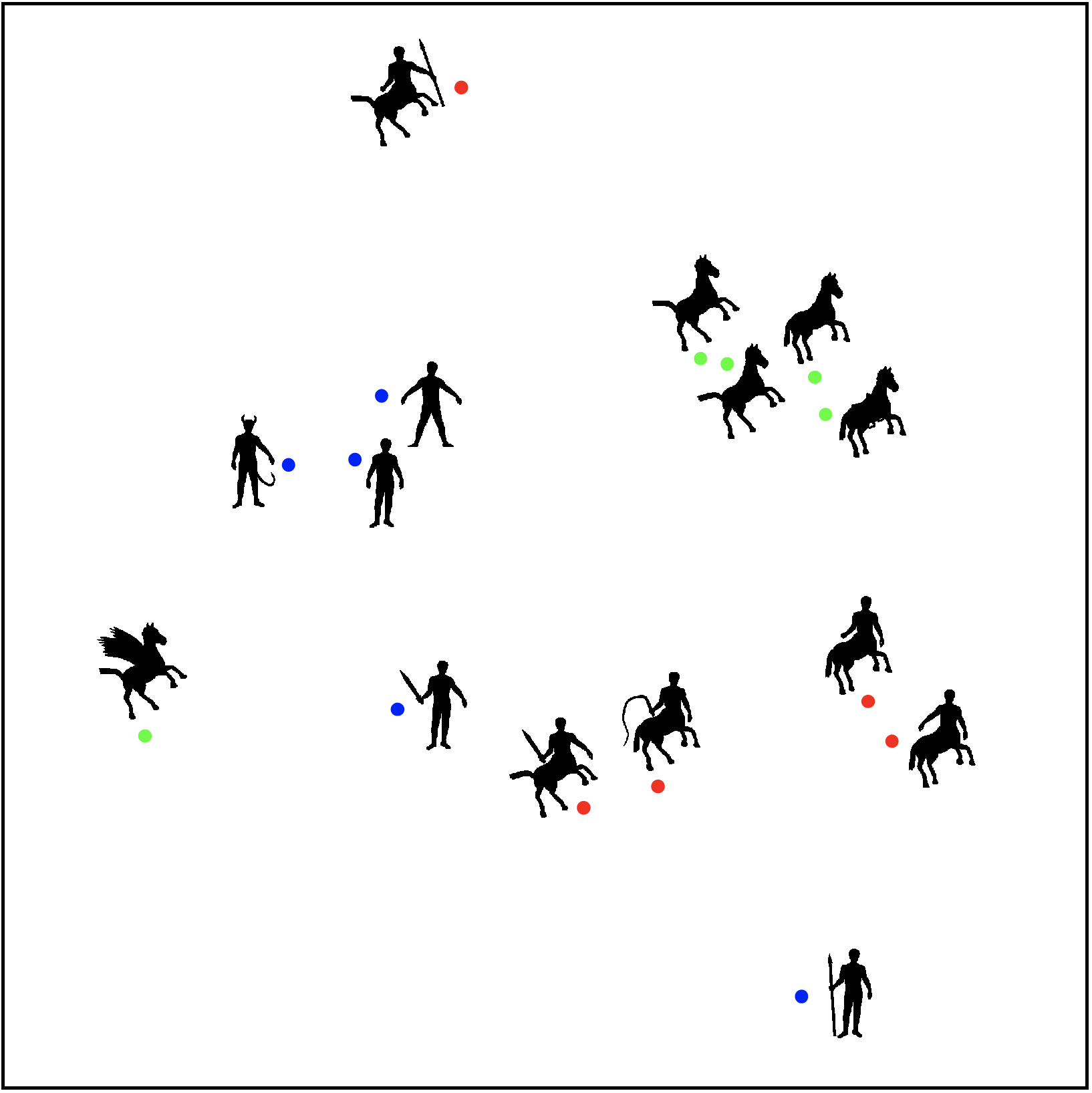
How far and how near are some figures under the Gromov–Hausdorff distance.

The Gromov–Hausdorff distance was introduced by David Edwards in 1975, and it was later rediscovered and generalized by Mikhail Gromov in 1981. This distance measures how far two compact metric spaces are from being isometric. If X and Y are two compact metric spaces, then d_{GH} (X, Y) is defined to be the infimum of all numbers d_{H}(f(X), g(Y)) for all (compact) metric spaces M and all isometric embeddings f : X → M and g : Y → M. Here d_{H} denotes Hausdorff distance between subsets in M and the isometric embedding is understood in the global sense, i.e. it must preserve all distances, not only infinitesimally small ones; for example no compact Riemannian manifold admits such an embedding into Euclidean space of the same dimension.

The Gromov–Hausdorff distance turns the set of all isometry classes of compact metric spaces into a metric space, called Gromov–Hausdorff space, and it therefore defines a notion of convergence for sequences of compact metric spaces, called Gromov–Hausdorff convergence. A metric space to which such a sequence converges is called the Gromov–Hausdorff limit of the sequence.

== Some properties of Gromov–Hausdorff space ==
The Gromov–Hausdorff space is path-connected, complete, and separable. It is also geodesic, i.e., any two of its points are the endpoints of a minimizing geodesic. In the global sense, the Gromov–Hausdorff space is totally heterogeneous, i.e., its isometry group is trivial, but locally there are many nontrivial isometries.

== Pointed Gromov–Hausdorff convergence ==
The pointed Gromov–Hausdorff convergence is an analog of Gromov–Hausdorff convergence appropriate for non-compact spaces. A pointed metric space is a pair (X,p) consisting of a metric space X and point p in X. A sequence (X_{n}, p_{n}) of pointed metric spaces converges to a pointed metric space (Y, p) if, for each R > 0, the sequence of closed R-balls around p_{n} in X_{n} converges to the closed R-ball around p in Y in the usual Gromov–Hausdorff sense.

== Applications ==
The notion of Gromov–Hausdorff convergence was used by Gromov to prove that any discrete group with polynomial growth is virtually nilpotent (i.e. it contains a nilpotent subgroup of finite index). See Gromov's theorem on groups of polynomial growth. (Also see D. Edwards for an earlier work.) The key ingredient in the proof was the observation that for the Cayley graph of a group with polynomial growth a sequence of rescalings converges in the pointed Gromov–Hausdorff sense.

Another simple and very useful result in Riemannian geometry is Gromov's compactness theorem, which states that the set of Riemannian manifolds with Ricci curvature ≥ c and diameter ≤ D is relatively compact in the Gromov–Hausdorff metric. The limit spaces are metric spaces. Additional properties on the length spaces have been proven by Cheeger and Colding.

The Gromov–Hausdorff distance metric has been applied in the field of computer graphics and computational geometry to find correspondences between different shapes. It also has been applied in the problem of motion planning in robotics.

The Gromov–Hausdorff distance has been used by Sormani to prove the stability of the Friedmann model in Cosmology. This model of cosmology is not stable with respect to smooth variations of the metric.

In a special case, the concept of Gromov–Hausdorff limits is closely related to large-deviations theory.

== See also ==
- Intrinsic flat distance
