= Almost flat manifold =

In mathematics, a smooth compact manifold M is called almost flat if for any $\varepsilon>0$ there is a Riemannian metric $g_\varepsilon$ on M such that $\mbox{diam}(M,g_\varepsilon)\le 1$ and $g_\varepsilon$ is $\varepsilon$-flat, i.e. for the sectional curvature of $K_{g_\varepsilon}$ we have $|K_{g_\epsilon}| < \varepsilon$.

Given $n$, there is a positive number $\varepsilon_n>0$ such that if an $n$-dimensional manifold admits an $\varepsilon_n$-flat metric with diameter $\le 1$ then it is almost flat. On the other hand, one can fix the bound of sectional curvature and get the diameter going to zero, so the almost-flat manifold is a special case of a collapsing manifold, which is collapsing along all directions.

According to the Gromov–Ruh theorem, $M$ is almost flat if and only if it is infranil. In particular, it is a finite factor of a nilmanifold, which is the total space of a principal torus bundle over a principal torus bundle over a torus.
