= Ricci curvature =

Tensor in differential geometry

Geodesic cones on surfaces of positive, zero, and negative curvature: a narrow family of geodesics initially moving in nearly the same direction converges on a sphere, spreads linearly in the Euclidean plane, and diverges on a negatively curved surface.

In differential geometry, the Ricci curvature tensor, named after Gregorio Ricci-Curbastro, measures how a curved space locally differs from flat space by tracking how nearby geodesics spread apart or converge. Formally, it is a symmetric rank-two tensor obtained by taking a trace of the Riemann curvature tensor of a Riemannian or pseudo-Riemannian metric. In Riemannian geometry, the Ricci curvature in a given tangent direction may be interpreted as an average of the sectional curvatures of planes containing that direction. A further trace of the Ricci curvature yields the scalar curvature.

In general relativity, the Ricci curvature tensor enters the Einstein field equations through the Einstein tensor, formed from the Ricci tensor, the scalar curvature, and the metric. The Ricci tensor is also fundamental in Riemannian geometry and geometric analysis. Bounds on Ricci curvature imply strong global geometric and topological consequences, as in Myers's theorem and related comparison theorems.

In dimension three, the Ricci tensor determines the full Riemann curvature tensor, a simplification that is important in the study of three-dimensional geometry. Ricci curvature is the curvature term driving the Ricci flow, introduced by Richard S. Hamilton and used by Grigori Perelman in the proof of the Poincaré conjecture. More recently, lower bounds for Ricci curvature have been extended to certain metric-measure spaces, connecting the subject with optimal transport and Wasserstein geometry.

== Definition ==
Suppose that $(M, g)$ is an $n$-dimensional Riemannian or pseudo-Riemannian manifold, equipped with its Levi-Civita connection $\nabla$. The Riemann curvature of $M$ is a map that takes smooth vector fields $X$, $Y$, and $Z$, and returns the vector field
$$R(X,Y)Z := \nabla_X\nabla_Y Z - \nabla_Y\nabla_XZ - \nabla_{[X,Y]}Z$$
on vector fields $X$, $Y$, $Z$. Since $R$ is a tensor field, for each point $p \in M$, it gives rise to a (multilinear) map:
$$\operatorname{R}_p\colon T_pM\times T_pM\times T_pM\to T_pM.$$
Define for each point $p \in M$ the map $\operatorname{Ric}_p\colon T_pM\times T_pM\to\mathbb{R}$ by
$$\operatorname{Ric}_p(Y,Z) := \operatorname{tr}\big(X\mapsto \operatorname{R}_p(X,Y)Z\big).$$

That is, having fixed $Y$ and $Z$, then for any orthonormal basis $v_1, \ldots, v_n$ of the vector space $T_p M$, one has
$$\operatorname{Ric}_p(Y,Z) = \sum_{i=1} \langle\operatorname{R}_p(v_i, Y) Z, v_i \rangle.$$

It is a standard exercise of (multi)linear algebra to verify that this definition does not depend on the choice of the basis $v_1, \ldots, v_n$.

In abstract index notation,
$$\operatorname{Ric}_{ab} = \operatorname{R}^{c}{}_{bca} = \operatorname{R}^{c}{}_{acb}.$$

Sign conventions. Note that some sources define $R(X,Y)Z$ to be what would here be called $-R(X,Y)Z$; they would then define $\operatorname{Ric}_p$ as $-\operatorname{tr}(X\mapsto \operatorname{R}_p(X,Y)Z)$. Although sign conventions differ about the Riemann tensor, they do not differ about the Ricci tensor.

=== Definition via local coordinates on a smooth manifold ===
Let $\left( M, g \right)$ be a smooth Riemannian or pseudo-Riemannian $n$-manifold. Given a smooth chart $\left( U, \varphi \right)$ one then has functions $g_{ij}\colon \varphi(U) \rightarrow \mathbb{R}$ and $g^{ij}: \varphi(U) \rightarrow \mathbb{R}$ for each $i, j = 1, \ldots, n$, which satisfy
$$\sum_{k=1}^n g^{ik}(x)g_{kj}(x) = \delta^{i}_j = \begin{cases} 1 & i=j \\ 0 & i \neq j \end{cases}$$
for all $x \in \varphi(U)$. The latter shows that, expressed as matrices, $g^{ij}(x) = (g^{-1})_{ij}(x)$. The functions $g_{ij}$ are defined by evaluating $g$ on coordinate vector fields, while the functions $g^{ij}$ are defined so that, as a matrix-valued function, they provide an inverse to the matrix-valued function $x \mapsto g_{ij}(x)$.

Now define, for each $a$, $b$, $c$, $i$, and $j$ between 1 and $n$, the functions
$$\begin{align}
\Gamma_{ab}^c &:= \frac{1}{2} \sum_{d=1}^n \left(\frac{\partial g_{bd}}{\partial x^a} + \frac{\partial g_{ad}}{\partial x^b} - \frac{\partial g_{ab}}{\partial x^d}\right)g^{cd}\\
R_{ij} &:= \sum_{a=1}^n\frac{\partial\Gamma_{ij}^a}{\partial x^a} - \sum_{a=1}^n\frac{\partial\Gamma_{ai}^a}{\partial x^j} + \sum_{a=1}^n\sum_{b=1}^n\left(\Gamma_{ab}^a\Gamma_{ij}^b - \Gamma_{ib}^a\Gamma_{aj}^b\right)
\end{align}$$
as maps $\varphi\colon U \to \mathbb{R}$.

Now let $\left( U, \varphi \right)$ and $\left( V, \psi \right)$ be two smooth charts with $U \cap V \neq \emptyset$. Let $R_{ij}: \varphi(U) \rightarrow \mathbb{R}$ be the functions computed as above via the chart $\left( U, \varphi \right)$ and let $r_{ij}: \psi(V) \rightarrow \mathbb{R}$ be the functions computed as above via the chart $\left( V, \psi \right)$. Then one can check by a calculation with the chain rule and the product rule that
$$R_{ij}(x) = \sum_{k,l=1}^n r_{kl}\left(\psi\circ\varphi^{-1}(x)\right)D_i\Big|_x \left(\psi\circ\varphi^{-1}\right)^kD_j\Big|_x \left(\psi\circ\varphi^{-1}\right)^l ,$$
where $D_{i}$ is the first derivative along $i$th direction of $\mathbb{R}^n$. This shows that the following definition does not depend on the choice of $\left( U, \varphi \right)$. For any $p \in U$, define a bilinear map $\operatorname{Ric}_p : T_p M \times T_p M \rightarrow \mathbb{R}$ by
$$(X, Y) \in T_p M \times T_p M \mapsto \operatorname{Ric}_p(X,Y) = \sum_{i,j=1}^n R_{ij}(\varphi(x))X^i(p)Y^j(p),$$
where $X^1, \ldots, X^n$ and $Y^1, \ldots, Y^n$ are the components of the tangent vectors at $p$ in $X$ and $Y$ relative to the coordinate vector fields of $\left( U, \varphi \right)$.

It is common to abbreviate the above formal presentation in the following style:

Let $M$ be a smooth manifold, and let g be a Riemannian or pseudo-Riemannian metric. In local smooth coordinates, define the Christoffel symbols

$$\begin{align}
\Gamma_{ij}^k &:= \frac{1}{2}g^{kl}\left(\partial_ig_{jl} + \partial_jg_{il} - \partial_lg_{ij}\right)\\
R_{jk} &:= \partial_i\Gamma_{jk}^i - \partial_k\Gamma_{ji}^i + \Gamma_{ip}^i\Gamma_{jk}^p - \Gamma_{jp}^i\Gamma_{ik}^p.
\end{align}$$

It can be directly checked that
$$R_{jk} = \widetilde{R}_{ab}\frac{\partial\widetilde{x}^a}{\partial x^j}\frac{\partial\widetilde{x}^b}{\partial x^k},$$
so that $R_{ij}$ define a (0,2)-tensor field on $M$. In particular, if $X$ and $Y$ are vector fields on $M$, then relative to any smooth coordinates one has

$$\begin{align}
R_{jk}X^jY^k
&= \left(\widetilde{R}_{ab}\frac{\partial\widetilde{x}^a}{\partial x^j}\frac{\partial\widetilde{x}^b}{\partial x^k}\right)\left(\widetilde{X}^c\frac{\partial x^j}{\partial\widetilde{x}^c}\right)\left(\widetilde{Y}^d\frac{\partial x^k}{\partial\widetilde{x}^d}\right) \\
&= \widetilde{R}_{ab}\widetilde{X}^c\widetilde{Y}^d\left(\frac{\partial\widetilde{x}^a}{\partial x^j}\frac{\partial x^j}{\partial\widetilde{x}^c}\right)\left(\frac{\partial\widetilde{x}^b}{\partial x^k}\frac{\partial x^k}{\partial\widetilde{x}^d}\right) \\
&= \widetilde{R}_{ab}\widetilde{X}^c\widetilde{Y}^d\delta_c^a\delta_d^b \\
&= \widetilde{R}_{ab}\widetilde{X}^a\widetilde{Y}^b.
\end{align}$$

The final line includes the demonstration that the bilinear map Ric is well-defined, which is much easier to write out with the informal notation.

=== Comparison of the definitions ===
The two above definitions are identical. The formulas defining $\Gamma_{ij}^k$ and $R_{ij}$ in the coordinate approach have an exact parallel in the formulas defining the Levi-Civita connection, and the Riemann curvature via the Levi-Civita connection. Arguably, the definitions directly using local coordinates are preferable, since the "crucial property" of the Riemann tensor mentioned above requires $M$ to be Hausdorff in order to hold. By contrast, the local coordinate approach only requires a smooth atlas. It is also somewhat easier to connect the "invariance" philosophy underlying the local approach with the methods of constructing more exotic geometric objects, such as spinor fields.

The complicated formula defining $R_{ij}$ in the introductory section is the same as that in the following section. The only difference is that terms have been grouped so that it is easy to see that $R_{ij}=R_{ji}$.

== Properties ==
As can be seen from the symmetries of the Riemann curvature tensor, the Ricci tensor of a Riemannian manifold is symmetric, in the sense that
$$\operatorname{Ric}(X ,Y) = \operatorname{Ric}(Y,X)$$
for all $X,Y\in T_pM$.

It thus follows linear-algebraically that the Ricci tensor is completely determined by knowing the quantity $\operatorname{Ric}(X, X)$ for all vectors $X$ of unit length. This function on the set of unit tangent vectors is often also called the Ricci curvature, since knowing it is equivalent to knowing the Ricci curvature tensor.

The Ricci curvature is determined by the sectional curvatures of a Riemannian manifold, but generally contains less information. Indeed, if $\xi$ is a vector of unit length on a Riemannian $n$-manifold, then $\operatorname{Ric}(\xi, \xi)$ is precisely $(n - 1)$ times the average value of the sectional curvature, taken over all the 2-planes containing $\xi$. There is an $(n - 2)$-dimensional family of such 2-planes, and so only in dimensions 2 and 3 does the Ricci tensor determine the full curvature tensor. A notable exception is when the manifold is given a priori as a hypersurface of Euclidean space. The second fundamental form, which determines the full curvature via the Gauss–Codazzi equation, is itself determined by the Ricci tensor and the principal directions of the hypersurface are also the eigendirections of the Ricci tensor. The tensor was introduced by Ricci for this reason.

As can be seen from the second Bianchi identity, one has
$$\operatorname{div}\operatorname{Ric} = \frac{1}{2}dR,$$
where $R$ is the scalar curvature, defined in local coordinates as $g^{ij}R_{ij}$. This is often called the contracted second Bianchi identity.

== Direct geometric meaning ==
Near any point $p$ in a Riemannian manifold $\left( M, g \right)$, one can define preferred local coordinates, called geodesic normal coordinates. These are adapted to the metric so that geodesics through $p$ correspond to straight lines through the origin, in such a manner that the geodesic distance from $p$ corresponds to the Euclidean distance from the origin. In these coordinates, the metric tensor is well-approximated by the Euclidean metric, in the precise sense that
$$g_{ij} = \delta_{ij} + O \left(|x|^2\right) .$$

In fact, by taking the Taylor expansion of the metric applied to a Jacobi field along a radial geodesic in the normal coordinate system, one has
$$g_{ij} = \delta_{ij} - \frac{1}{3} R_{ikjl}x^kx^l + O\left(|x|^3\right) .$$

In these coordinates, the metric volume element then has the following expansion at p:
$$d\mu_g = \left[ 1 - \frac{1}{6} R_{jk}x^j x^k+ O\left(|x|^3\right) \right] d\mu_\text{Euclidean} ,$$
which follows by expanding the square root of the determinant of the metric.

Thus, if the Ricci curvature $\operatorname{Ric}(\xi, \xi)$ is positive in the direction of a vector $\xi$, the conical region in $M$ swept out by a tightly focused family of geodesic segments of length $\varepsilon$ emanating from $p$, with initial velocity inside a small cone about $\xi$, will have smaller volume than the corresponding conical region in Euclidean space, at least provided that $\varepsilon$ is sufficiently small. Similarly, if the Ricci curvature is negative in the direction of a given vector $\xi$, such a conical region in the manifold will instead have larger volume than it would in Euclidean space.

The Ricci curvature is essentially an average of curvatures in the planes including $\xi$. Thus if a cone emitted with an initially circular (or spherical) cross-section becomes distorted into an ellipse (ellipsoid), it is possible for the volume distortion to vanish if the distortions along the principal axes counteract one another. The Ricci curvature would then vanish along $\xi$. In physical applications, the presence of a nonvanishing sectional curvature does not necessarily indicate the presence of any mass locally; if an initially circular cross-section of a cone of worldlines later becomes elliptical, without changing its volume, then this is due to tidal effects from a mass at some other location.

== Examples ==
=== Space forms ===
If an n-dimensional Riemannian manifold has constant sectional curvature K, then
$$\operatorname{Ric} = (n-1)K g$$
and
$$R = n(n-1)K.$$
Thus Euclidean space has zero Ricci curvature, the round sphere has positive Ricci curvature, and hyperbolic space has negative Ricci curvature.

=== Surfaces ===
On a two-dimensional Riemannian manifold, the Ricci tensor is completely determined by the Gaussian curvature:
$$\operatorname{Ric} = K g.$$
The scalar curvature is therefore
$$R = 2K.$$

=== Products ===
For a product Riemannian manifold M × N with the product metric, the Ricci tensor splits as the sum of the Ricci tensors of the factors. In particular, a product may have mixed Ricci behavior in different tangent directions.

== Applications ==
Ricci curvature plays an important role in general relativity, where it is the key term in the Einstein field equations. Through the Raychaudhuri equation, it also governs the expansion of geodesic congruences.

Ricci curvature also appears in the Ricci flow equation, first introduced by Richard S. Hamilton in 1982, where certain one-parameter families of Riemannian metrics are singled out as solutions of a geometrically defined partial differential equation. In harmonic local coordinates the Ricci tensor can be expressed as
$$R_{ij} = -\frac{1}{2}\Delta \left(g_{ij}\right) + \text{lower-order terms},$$
where $g_{ij}$ are the components of the metric tensor and $\Delta$ is the Laplace–Beltrami operator. This fact motivates the introduction of the Ricci flow equation as a natural extension of the heat equation for the metric. Since heat tends to spread through a solid until the body reaches an equilibrium state of constant temperature, if one is given a manifold, the Ricci flow may be hoped to produce an 'equilibrium' Riemannian metric that is Einstein or of constant curvature. However, such a clean "convergence" picture cannot be achieved since many manifolds cannot support such metrics. A detailed study of the nature of solutions of the Ricci flow, due principally to Hamilton and Grigori Perelman, shows that the types of "singularities" that occur along a Ricci flow, corresponding to the failure of convergence, encodes deep information about 3-dimensional topology. The culmination of this work was a proof of the geometrization conjecture first proposed by William Thurston in the 1970s, which can be thought of as a classification of compact 3-manifolds.

On a Kähler manifold, the Ricci curvature determines the first Chern class of the manifold (mod torsion). However, the Ricci curvature has no analogous topological interpretation on a generic Riemannian manifold.

== Global geometry and topology ==
Here is a short list of global results concerning manifolds with positive Ricci curvature; see also classical theorems of Riemannian geometry. Briefly, positive Ricci curvature of a Riemannian manifold has strong topological consequences, while (for dimension at least 3), negative Ricci curvature has no topological implications. (The Ricci curvature is said to be positive if the Ricci curvature function $\operatorname{Ric}(\xi, \xi)$ is positive on the set of non-zero tangent vectors $\xi$.) Some results are also known for pseudo-Riemannian manifolds.

1. Myers's theorem (1941) states that if the Ricci curvature is bounded from below on a complete Riemannian n-manifold by $(n - 1)k > 0$, then the manifold has diameter $\leq \pi / \sqrt{k}$. By a covering-space argument, it follows that any compact manifold of positive Ricci curvature must have finite fundamental group. Cheng (1975) showed that, in this setting, equality in the diameter inequality occurs if only if the manifold is isometric to a sphere of a constant curvature $k$.
2. The Bishop–Gromov inequality states that if a complete $n$-dimensional Riemannian manifold has non-negative Ricci curvature, then the volume of a geodesic ball is less than or equal to the volume of a geodesic ball of the same radius in Euclidean $n$-space. Moreover, if $v_p(R)$ denotes the volume of the ball with center $p$ and radius $R$ in the manifold and $V(R) = c_n R^n$ denotes the volume of the ball of radius $R$ in Euclidean $n$-space then the function $v_p(R) / V(R)$ is nonincreasing. This can be generalized to any lower bound on the Ricci curvature (not just nonnegativity), and is the key point in the proof of Gromov's compactness theorem.
3. The Cheeger–Gromoll splitting theorem states that if a complete Riemannian manifold $\left( M, g \right)$ with $\operatorname{Ric} \geq 0$ contains a line, meaning a geodesic $\gamma : \mathbb{R} \to M$ such that $d(\gamma(u), \gamma(v)) = \left| u - v \right|$ for all $u, v \in \mathbb{R}$, then it is isometric to a product space $\mathbb{R} \times L$. Consequently, a complete manifold of positive Ricci curvature can have at most one topological end. The theorem is also true under some additional hypotheses for complete Lorentzian manifolds (of metric signature $\left( + - - \ldots \right)$) with non-negative Ricci tensor.
4. Hamilton's first convergence theorem for Ricci flow has, as a corollary, that the only compact 3-manifolds that have Riemannian metrics of positive Ricci curvature are the quotients of the 3-sphere by discrete subgroups of SO(4) that act properly discontinuously. He later extended this to allow for nonnegative Ricci curvature. In particular, the only simply-connected possibility is the 3-sphere itself.

These results, particularly Myers and Hamilton's, show that positive Ricci curvature has strong topological consequences. By contrast, excluding the case of surfaces, negative Ricci curvature is now known to have no topological implications; Lohkamp (1994) has shown that any manifold of dimension greater than two admits a complete Riemannian metric of negative Ricci curvature. In the case of two-dimensional manifolds, negativity of the Ricci curvature is synonymous with negativity of the Gaussian curvature, which has very clear topological implications. There are very few two-dimensional manifolds that fail to admit Riemannian metrics of negative Gaussian curvature.

== Behavior under conformal rescaling ==
If the metric $g$ is changed by multiplying it by a conformal factor $e^{2f}$, the Ricci tensor of the new, conformally-related metric $\tilde{g} = e^{2f} g$ is given by
$$\widetilde{\operatorname{Ric}}=\operatorname{Ric}+(2-n)\left[ \nabla df-df\otimes df\right]+\left[\Delta f -(n-2)\|df\|^2\right]g ,$$
where $\Delta = {\star}d{\star}d$ is the (positive spectrum) Hodge Laplacian, i.e., the opposite of the usual trace of the Hessian.

In particular, given a point $p$ in a Riemannian manifold, it is always possible to find metrics conformal to the given metric $g$ for which the Ricci tensor vanishes at $p$. Note, however, that this is only pointwise assertion; it is usually impossible to make the Ricci curvature vanish identically on the entire manifold by a conformal rescaling.

For two dimensional manifolds, the above formula shows that if $f$ is a harmonic function, then the conformal scaling $g \mapsto e^{2f}g$ does not change the Ricci tensor (although it still changes its trace with respect to the metric unless $f = 0$.

== Trace-free Ricci tensor ==
In Riemannian geometry and pseudo-Riemannian geometry, the trace-free Ricci tensor (also called traceless Ricci tensor) of a Riemannian or pseudo-Riemannian $n$-manifold $\left( M, g \right)$ is the tensor defined by
$$Z = \operatorname{Ric} - \frac{1}{n}Rg ,$$
where $\operatorname{Ric}$ and $R$ denote the Ricci curvature and scalar curvature of $g$. The name of this object reflects the fact that its trace automatically vanishes: $\operatorname{tr}_gZ\equiv g^{ab}Z_{ab} = 0$. However, it is quite an important tensor since it reflects an "orthogonal decomposition" of the Ricci tensor.

=== Orthogonal decomposition of the Ricci tensor ===
The following, not so trivial, property is
$$\operatorname{Ric} = Z + \frac{1}{n}Rg.$$

It is less immediately obvious that the two terms on the right hand side are orthogonal to each other:
$$\left\langle Z, \frac{1}{n}Rg\right\rangle_g \equiv g^{ab}\left(R_{ab} - \frac{1}{n}Rg_{ab}\right) = 0.$$

An identity that is intimately connected with this (but which could be proved directly) is that
$$\left|\operatorname{Ric}\right|_g^2 = |Z|_g^2 + \frac{1}{n}R^2.$$

=== Trace-free Ricci tensor and Einstein metrics ===
By taking a divergence, and using the contracted Bianchi identity, one sees that $Z = 0$ implies $\textstyle \frac{1}{2}dR - \frac{1}{n}dR = 0$. So, provided that n ≥ 3 and $M$ is connected, the vanishing of $Z$ implies that the scalar curvature is constant. One can then see that the following are equivalent:

- $Z = 0$
- $\operatorname{Ric} = \lambda g$ for some number $\lambda$
- $\operatorname{Ric} = \frac{1}{n}Rg$

In the Riemannian setting, the above orthogonal decomposition shows that $R^2 = n\left|\operatorname{Ric}\right|^2$ is also equivalent to these conditions. In the pseudo-Riemmannian setting, by contrast, the condition $|Z|_g^2 = 0$ does not necessarily imply $Z = 0$, so the most that one can say is that these conditions imply $R^2 = n \left\vert \operatorname{Ric} \right\vert_g^2$.

In particular, the vanishing of trace-free Ricci tensor characterizes Einstein manifolds, as defined by the condition $\operatorname{Ric} = \lambda g$ for a number $\lambda.$ In general relativity, this equation states that $\left( M, g \right)$ is a solution of Einstein's vacuum field equations with cosmological constant.

== Kähler manifolds ==
On a Kähler manifold $X$, the Ricci curvature determines the curvature form of the canonical line bundle. The canonical line bundle is the top exterior power of the bundle of holomorphic Kähler differentials:
$$\kappa = {\textstyle\bigwedge}^n ~ \Omega_X.$$

The Levi-Civita connection corresponding to the metric on $X$ gives rise to a connection on $\kappa$. The curvature of this connection is the 2-form defined by
$$\rho(X,Y) \;\stackrel{\text{def}}{=}\; \operatorname{Ric}(JX,Y)$$
where $J$ is the complex structure map on the tangent bundle determined by the structure of the Kähler manifold. The Ricci form is a closed 2-form. Its cohomology class is, up to a real constant factor, the first Chern class of the canonical bundle, and is therefore a topological invariant of $X$ (for compact $X$) in the sense that it depends only on the topology of $X$ and the homotopy class of the complex structure.

Conversely, the Ricci form determines the Ricci tensor by
$$\operatorname{Ric}(X, Y) = \rho(X, JY).$$

In local holomorphic coordinates $z^\alpha$, the Ricci form is given by
$$\rho = -i\partial\overline{\partial}\log\det\left(g_{\alpha\overline{\beta}}\right)$$
where ∂ is the Dolbeault operator and
$$g_{\alpha\overline{\beta}} = g\left(\frac{\partial}{\partial z^\alpha}, \frac{\partial}{\partial\overline{z}^\beta}\right).$$

If the Ricci tensor vanishes, then the canonical bundle is flat, so the structure group can be locally reduced to a subgroup of the special linear group $\mathrm{SL}(n; \mathbb{C})$. However, Kähler manifolds already possess holonomy in $\mathrm{U}(n)$, and so the (restricted) holonomy of a Ricci-flat Kähler manifold is contained in $\mathrm{SU}(n)$. Conversely, if the (restricted) holonomy of a 2$n$-dimensional Riemannian manifold is contained in $\mathrm{SU}(n)$, then the manifold is a Ricci-flat Kähler manifold.

== Generalization to affine connections ==
The Ricci tensor can also be generalized to arbitrary affine connections, where it is an invariant that plays an especially important role in the study of projective geometry (geometry associated to unparameterized geodesics). If $\nabla$ denotes an affine connection, then the curvature tensor $R$ is the (1,3)-tensor defined by
$$R(X,Y)Z = \nabla_X\nabla_Y Z - \nabla_Y\nabla_XZ - \nabla_{[X,Y]}Z$$
for any vector fields $X$, $Y$, $Z$. The Ricci tensor is defined to be the trace:
$$\operatorname{ric}(X,Y) = \operatorname{tr}\big(Z\mapsto R(Z,X)Y\big).$$

In this more general situation, the Ricci tensor is symmetric if and only if there exists locally a parallel volume form for the connection.

== Discrete Ricci curvature ==
Notions of Ricci curvature on discrete manifolds have been defined on graphs and networks, where they quantify local divergence properties of edges. Ollivier's Ricci curvature is defined using optimal transport theory. A different (and earlier) notion, Forman's Ricci curvature, is based on topological arguments.

== See also ==
- Curvature of Riemannian manifolds
- Scalar curvature
- Ricci calculus
- Ricci decomposition
- Ricci-flat manifold
- Christoffel symbols
- Introduction to the mathematics of general relativity
- Schouten tensor
