= Gromov's theorem on groups of polynomial growth =

Theorem in geometric group theory

In geometric group theory, Gromov's theorem on groups of polynomial growth, first proved by Mikhail Gromov, characterizes finitely generated groups of polynomial growth, as those groups which have nilpotent subgroups of finite index.

== Statement ==
The growth rate of a group is a well-defined notion from asymptotic analysis. To say that a finitely generated group has polynomial growth means the number of elements of length at most n (relative to a symmetric generating set) is bounded above by a polynomial function p(n). The order of growth is then the least degree of any such polynomial function p.

A nilpotent group G is a group with a lower central series terminating in the identity subgroup.

Gromov's theorem states that a finitely generated group has polynomial growth if and only if it has a nilpotent subgroup that is of finite index.

== Growth rates of nilpotent groups ==
There is a vast literature on growth rates, leading up to Gromov's theorem. An earlier result of Joseph A. Wolf showed that if G is a finitely generated nilpotent group, then the group has polynomial growth. Yves Guivarc'h and independently Hyman Bass (with different proofs) computed the exact order of polynomial growth. Let G be a finitely generated nilpotent group with lower central series

$$G = G_1 \supseteq G_2 \supseteq \cdots.$$

In particular, the quotient group G_{k}/G_{k+1} is a finitely generated abelian group.

The Bass–Guivarc'h formula states that the order of polynomial growth of G is

$$d(G) = \sum_{k \geq 1} k \operatorname{rank}(G_k/G_{k+1})$$

where:

rank denotes the rank of an abelian group, i.e. the largest number of independent and torsion-free elements of the abelian group.

In particular, Gromov's theorem and the Bass–Guivarc'h formula imply that the order of polynomial growth of a finitely generated group is always either an integer or infinity (excluding for example, fractional powers).

Another nice application of Gromov's theorem and the Bass–Guivarch formula is to the quasi-isometric rigidity of finitely generated abelian groups: any group which is quasi-isometric to a finitely generated abelian group contains a free abelian group of finite index.

== Proofs of Gromov's theorem ==
In order to prove this theorem Gromov introduced a convergence for metric spaces. This convergence, now called the Gromov–Hausdorff convergence, is currently widely used in geometry.

A relatively simple proof of the theorem was found by Bruce Kleiner. Later, Terence Tao and Yehuda Shalom modified Kleiner's proof to make an essentially elementary proof as well as a version of the theorem with explicit bounds. Gromov's theorem also follows from the classification of approximate groups obtained by Breuillard, Green and Tao. A simple and concise proof based on functional analytic methods is given by Ozawa.

== The gap conjecture ==
Beyond Gromov's theorem one can ask whether there exists a gap in the growth spectrum for finitely generated group just above polynomial growth, separating virtually nilpotent groups from others. Formally, this means that there would exist a function $f: \mathbb N \to \mathbb N$ such that a finitely generated group is virtually nilpotent if and only if its growth function is an $O(f(n))$. Such a theorem was obtained by Shalom and Tao, with an explicit function $n^{\log\log(n)^c}$ for some $c > 0$. All known groups with intermediate growth (i.e. both superpolynomial and subexponential) are essentially generalizations of Grigorchuk's group, and have faster growth functions; so all known groups have growth faster than $e^{n^{\alpha-o(1)}}$, with $\alpha = \log(2)/\log(2/\eta ) \approx 0.767$, where $\eta$ is the real root of the polynomial $x^3+x^2+x-2$.

It is conjectured that the true lower bound on growth rates of groups with intermediate growth is $e^{\sqrt n}$. This is known as the Gap conjecture.

== See also ==
- Breuillard–Green–Tao theorem
