= Bishop–Gromov inequality =

On volumes in complete Riemannian n-manifolds whose Ricci curvature has a lower bound

In mathematics, the Bishop–Gromov inequality is a comparison theorem in Riemannian geometry, named after Richard L. Bishop and Mikhail Gromov. It is closely related to Myers' theorem, and is the key point in the proof of Gromov's compactness theorem.

== Statement ==
Let $M$ be a complete n-dimensional Riemannian manifold whose Ricci curvature satisfies the lower bound

$$\mathrm{Ric} \geq (n-1) K$$

for a constant $K\in \R$. Let $M_K^n$ be the complete n-dimensional simply connected space of constant sectional curvature $K$ (and hence of constant Ricci curvature $(n-1)K$); thus $M_K^n$ is the n-sphere of radius $1/\sqrt{K}$ if $K>0$, or n-dimensional Euclidean space if $K=0$, or an appropriately rescaled version of n-dimensional hyperbolic space if $K<0$. Denote by $B(p,r)$ the ball of radius r around a point p, defined with respect to the Riemannian distance function.

Then, for any $p\in M$ and $p_K\in M_K^n$, the function

$$\phi(r) =  \frac{\mathrm{Vol} \, B(p,r)}{\mathrm{Vol}\, B(p_K,r)}$$

is non-increasing on $(0,\infty)$.

As r goes to zero, the ratio approaches one, so together with the monotonicity this implies that

$$\mathrm{Vol} \,B(p,r) \leq \mathrm{Vol} \, B(p_K,r).$$

This is the version first proved by Bishop.

== See also ==
- Comparison theorem
- Gromov's inequality (disambiguation)
