= Non-squeezing theorem =

Theorem in symplectic geometry

The non-squeezing theorem, also called Gromov's non-squeezing theorem, is one of the most important theorems in symplectic geometry. It was first proven in 1985 by Mikhail Gromov. The theorem states that one cannot embed a ball into a cylinder via a symplectic map unless the radius of the ball is less than or equal to the radius of the cylinder. The theorem is important because formerly very little was known about the geometry behind symplectic maps. One easy consequence of a transformation being symplectic is that it preserves volume. One can easily embed a ball of any radius into a cylinder of any other radius by a volume-preserving transformation: just picture squeezing the ball into the cylinder (hence, the name non-squeezing theorem). Thus, the non-squeezing theorem tells us that, although symplectic transformations are volume-preserving, it is much more restrictive for a transformation to be symplectic than it is to be volume-preserving.

== Background and statement ==
Consider the symplectic spaces

$$\mathbb{R}^{2n} = \{z = (x_1, \ldots , x_n, y_1, \ldots , y_n) \},$$
$$B^{2n}(r) = \{z \in \mathbb{R}^{2n} : \| z \| < r \},$$
$$Z^{2n}(R) = \{z \in \mathbb{R}^{2n} : x_1^2 + y_1^2 < R^2 \},$$

each endowed with the symplectic form

$$\omega = dx_1 \wedge dy_1 + \cdots + dx_n \wedge dy_n.$$

The space $B^{2n}(r)$ is called the ball of radius $r$ and $Z^{2n}(R)$ is called the cylinder of radius $R$. The choice of axes for the cylinder are not arbitrary given the fixed symplectic form above; the circles of the cylinder each lie in a symplectic subspace of $\mathbb{R}^{2n}$.

If $(M,\eta)$ and $(N,\nu)$ are symplectic manifolds, a symplectic embedding $\varphi : (M,\eta) \to (N,\nu)$ is a smooth embedding $\varphi : M \to N$ such that $\varphi^* \nu = \eta$. For $r \leq R$, there is a symplectic embedding $B^{2n}(r) \to Z^{2n}(R)$ which takes $x \in B^{2n}(r) \subset \mathbb R^{2n}$ to the same point $x \in Z^{2n}(R) \subset \mathbb R^{2n}$.

Gromov's non-squeezing theorem says that if there is a symplectic embedding $\varphi : B^{2n}(r) \to Z^{2n}(R)$, then $r \leq R$.

== Symplectic capacities ==
A symplectic capacity is a map $c : \{ \text{symplectic manifolds} \} \to [0,\infty]$ satisfying

1. (Monotonicity) If there is a symplectic embedding $(M, \omega) \to (N,\eta)$ and $\dim M = \dim N$, then $c(M,\omega) \leq c(N,\eta)$,
2. (Conformality) $c(M, \lambda \omega) = \lambda c(M, \omega)$,
3. (Nontriviality) $c(B^{2n}(1)) > 0$ and $c(Z^{2n}(1)) < \infty$.

The existence of a symplectic capacity satisfying

$$c(B^{2n}(1)) = c(Z^{2n}(1)) = \pi$$

is equivalent to Gromov's non-squeezing theorem. Given such a capacity, one can verify the non-squeezing theorem, and given the non-squeezing theorem, the Gromov width

$$w_G(M, \omega) = \sup \{ \pi r^2 : \text{there exists a symplectic embedding } B^{2n}(r) \to (M,\omega) \}$$

is such a capacity.

== The “symplectic camel” ==
Gromov's non-squeezing theorem has also become known as the principle of the symplectic camel since Ian Stewart referred to it by alluding to the parable of the camel and the eye of a needle. As Maurice A. de Gosson states:

Now, why do we refer to a symplectic camel in the title of this paper? This is because one can restate Gromov’s theorem in the following way: there is no way to deform a phase space ball using canonical transformations in such a way that we can make it pass through a hole in a plane of conjugate coordinates $x_j$ , $p_j$ if the area of that hole is smaller than that of the cross-section of that ball.

— Maurice A. de Gosson, The Symplectic Camel and the Uncertainty Principle: The Tip of an Iceberg?

Similarly:

Intuitively, a volume in phase space cannot be stretched with respect to one particular symplectic plane more than its “symplectic width” allows. In other words, it is impossible to squeeze a symplectic camel into the eye of a needle, if the needle is small enough. This is a very powerful result, which is intimately tied to the Hamiltonian nature of the system, and is a completely different result than Liouville's theorem, which only interests the overall volume and does not pose any restriction on the shape.

— Andrea Censi, Symplectic camels and uncertainty analysis

Although the term "symplectic camel" is sometimes used loosely to describe Gromov's non-squeezing theorem in its static form, experts in symplectic topology reserve it for the parametric version, which concerns the impossibility of moving a symplectic ball from one side of a hyperplane H to the other via a one-parameter family of symplectic embeddings, in such a way that the symplectic reductions of the intersections of the balls with the hyperplane H are always contained in a cylinder of smaller capacity.

== Further work ==
De Gosson has shown that the non-squeezing theorem is closely linked to the Robertson–Schrödinger–Heisenberg inequality, a generalization of the Heisenberg uncertainty relation. The Robertson–Schrödinger–Heisenberg inequality states that:

$$\operatorname{var}(Q) \operatorname{var}(P) \geq \operatorname{cov}^2(Q,P) + \left(\frac{\hbar}{2}\right)^2$$

with Q and P the canonical coordinates and var and cov the variance and covariance functions.
