= Gromov's compactness theorem (topology) =

Theorem in symplectic topology

In the mathematical field of symplectic topology, Gromov's compactness theorem states that a sequence of pseudoholomorphic curves in an almost complex manifold with a uniform energy bound must have a subsequence which limits to a pseudoholomorphic curve which may have nodes or (a finite tree of) "bubbles". A bubble is a holomorphic sphere which has a transverse intersection with the rest of the curve. This theorem, and its generalizations to punctured pseudoholomorphic curves, underlies the compactness results for flow lines in Floer homology and symplectic field theory. The theorem is named after Mikhael Gromov who published it in 1985.

If the complex structures on the curves in the sequence do not vary, only bubbles can occur; nodes can occur only if the complex structures on the domain are allowed to vary. Usually, the energy bound is achieved by considering a symplectic manifold with compatible almost-complex structure as the target, and assuming that curves to lie in a fixed homology class in the target. This is because the energy of such a pseudoholomorphic curve is given by the integral of the target symplectic form over the curve, and thus by evaluating the cohomology class of that symplectic form on the homology class of the curve. The finiteness of the bubble tree follows from (positive) lower bounds on the energy contributed by a holomorphic sphere.
