= Gromov's compactness theorem (geometry) =

On when a set of compact Riemannian manifolds of a given dimension is relatively compact

In the mathematical field of metric geometry, Mikhael Gromov proved a fundamental compactness theorem for sequences of metric spaces. In the special case of Riemannian manifolds, the key assumption of his compactness theorem is automatically satisfied under an assumption on Ricci curvature. These theorems have been widely used in the fields of geometric group theory and Riemannian geometry.

== Metric compactness theorem ==
The Gromov–Hausdorff distance defines a notion of distance between any two metric spaces, thereby setting up the concept of a sequence of metric spaces which converges to another metric space. This is known as Gromov–Hausdorff convergence. Gromov found a condition on a sequence of compact metric spaces which ensures that a subsequence converges to some metric space relative to the Gromov–Hausdorff distance:

Let (X_{i}, d_{i}) be a sequence of compact metric spaces with uniformly bounded diameter. Suppose that for every positive number ε there is a natural number N and, for every i, the set X_{i} can be covered by N metric balls of radius ε. Then the sequence (X_{i}, d_{i}) has a subsequence which converges relative to the Gromov–Hausdorff distance.

The role of this theorem in the theory of Gromov–Hausdorff convergence may be considered as analogous to the role of the Arzelà–Ascoli theorem in the theory of uniform convergence. Gromov first formally introduced it in his 1981 resolution of the Milnor–Wolf conjecture in the field of geometric group theory, where he applied it to define the asymptotic cone of certain metric spaces. These techniques were later extended by Gromov and others, using the theory of ultrafilters.

== Riemannian compactness theorem ==
Specializing to the setting of geodesically complete Riemannian manifolds with a fixed lower bound on the Ricci curvature, the crucial covering condition in Gromov's metric compactness theorem is automatically satisfied as a corollary of the Bishop–Gromov volume comparison theorem. As such, it follows that:

Consider a sequence of closed Riemannian manifolds with a uniform lower bound on the Ricci curvature and a uniform upper bound on the diameter. Then there is a subsequence which converges relative to the Gromov–Hausdorff distance.

The limit of a convergent subsequence may be a metric space without any smooth or Riemannian structure. This special case of the metric compactness theorem is significant in the field of Riemannian geometry, as it isolates the purely metric consequences of lower Ricci curvature bounds.
