= Nilmanifold =

Differentiable manifold

In mathematics, a nilmanifold is a differentiable manifold which has a transitive nilpotent group of diffeomorphisms acting on it. As such, a nilmanifold is an example of a homogeneous space and is diffeomorphic to the quotient space $N/H$, the quotient of a nilpotent Lie group N modulo a closed subgroup H. This notion was introduced by Anatoly Mal'cev in 1949.

In the Riemannian category, there is also a good notion of a nilmanifold. A Riemannian manifold is called a homogeneous nilmanifold if there exist a nilpotent group of isometries acting transitively on it. The requirement that the transitive nilpotent group acts by isometries leads to the following rigid characterization: every homogeneous nilmanifold is isometric to a nilpotent Lie group with left-invariant metric (see Wilson).

Nilmanifolds are important geometric objects and often arise as concrete examples with interesting properties; in Riemannian geometry these spaces always have mixed curvature, almost flat spaces arise as quotients of nilmanifolds, and compact nilmanifolds have been used to construct elementary examples of collapse of Riemannian metrics under the Ricci flow.

In addition to their role in geometry, nilmanifolds are increasingly being seen as having a role in arithmetic combinatorics (see Green–Tao) and ergodic theory (see, e.g., Host–Kra).

== Compact nilmanifolds ==
One way to construct a compact nilmanifold is to start with a simply connected nilpotent Lie group N and a discrete subgroup $\Gamma$. If the subgroup $\Gamma$ acts cocompactly (via right multiplication) on N, then the quotient manifold $N/ \Gamma$ will be a compact nilmanifold. As Mal'cev has shown, every compact nilmanifold is obtained this way.

Such a subgroup $\Gamma$ as above is called a lattice in N. It is well known that a nilpotent Lie group admits a lattice if and only if its Lie algebra admits a basis with rational structure constants: this is Mal'cev's criterion. Not all nilpotent Lie groups admit lattices; for more details, see also M. S. Raghunathan.

A compact Riemannian nilmanifold is a compact Riemannian manifold which is locally isometric to a nilpotent Lie group with left-invariant metric. These spaces are constructed as follows. Let $\Gamma$ be a lattice in a simply connected nilpotent Lie group N, as above. Endow N with a left-invariant (Riemannian) metric. Then the subgroup $\Gamma$ acts by isometries on N via left-multiplication. Thus the quotient $\Gamma \backslash N$ is a compact space locally isometric to N. Note: this space is naturally diffeomorphic to $N / \Gamma$.

Compact nilmanifolds also arise as principal bundles. For example, consider a 2-step nilpotent Lie group N which admits a lattice (see above). Let $Z=[N,N]$ be the commutator subgroup of N. Denote by p the dimension of Z and by q the codimension of Z; i.e. the dimension of N is p+q. It is known (see Raghunathan) that $Z \cap \Gamma$ is a lattice in Z. Hence, $G = Z/(Z \cap \Gamma )$ is a p-dimensional compact torus. Since Z is central in N, the group G acts on the compact nilmanifold $P = N/ \Gamma$ with quotient space $M=P/G$. This base manifold M is a q-dimensional compact torus. It has been shown that every principal torus bundle over a torus is of this form. More generally, a compact nilmanifold is a torus bundle, over a torus bundle, over...over a torus.

As mentioned above, almost flat manifolds are intimately compact nilmanifolds. See that article for more information.

== Complex nilmanifolds ==
Historically, a complex nilmanifold meant a quotient of a complex nilpotent Lie group over a cocompact lattice. An example of such a nilmanifold is an Iwasawa manifold. From the 1980s, another (more general) notion of a complex nilmanifold gradually replaced this one.

An almost complex structure on a real Lie algebra g is an endomorphism $I:\; g \rightarrow g$ which squares to −Id_{g}. This operator is called a complex structure if its eigenspaces, corresponding to eigenvalues $\pm \sqrt{-1}$, are subalgebras in $g \otimes {\mathbb C}$. In this case, I defines a left-invariant complex structure on the corresponding Lie group. Such a manifold (G,I) is called a complex group manifold. It is easy to see that every connected complex homogeneous manifold equipped with a free, transitive, holomorphic action by a real Lie group is obtained this way.

Let G be a real, nilpotent Lie group. A complex nilmanifold is a quotient of a complex group manifold (G,I), equipped with a left-invariant complex structure, by a discrete, cocompact lattice, acting from the right.

Complex nilmanifolds are usually not homogeneous, as complex varieties.

In complex dimension 2, the only complex nilmanifolds are a complex torus and a Kodaira surface.

== Properties ==
Compact nilmanifolds (except a torus) are never homotopy formal. This implies immediately that compact nilmanifolds (except a torus) cannot admit a Kähler structure (see also).

Topologically, all nilmanifolds can be obtained as iterated torus bundles over a torus. This is easily seen from a filtration by ascending central series.

== Examples ==
=== Nilpotent Lie groups ===
From the above definition of homogeneous nilmanifolds, it is clear that any nilpotent Lie group with left-invariant metric is a homogeneous nilmanifold. The most familiar nilpotent Lie groups are matrix groups whose diagonal entries are 1 and whose lower diagonal entries are all zeros.

For example, the Heisenberg group is a 2-step nilpotent Lie group. This nilpotent Lie group is also special in that it admits a compact quotient. The group $\Gamma$ would be the upper triangular matrices with integral coefficients. The resulting nilmanifold is 3-dimensional. One possible fundamental domain is (isomorphic to) [0,1]^{3} with the faces identified in a suitable way. This is because an element
$$\begin{pmatrix} 1 & x & z \\ & 1 & y \\ & & 1\end{pmatrix}\Gamma$$
of the nilmanifold can be represented by the element
$$\begin{pmatrix} 1 & \{x\} & \{z-x \lfloor y \rfloor \} \\ & 1 & \{y\} \\ & & 1\end{pmatrix}$$
in the fundamental domain. Here $\lfloor x \rfloor$ denotes the floor function of x, and $\{ x \}$ the fractional part. The appearance of the floor function here is a clue to the relevance of nilmanifolds to additive combinatorics: the so-called bracket polynomials, or generalised polynomials, seem to be important in the development of higher-order Fourier analysis.

=== Abelian Lie groups ===
A simpler example would be any abelian Lie group. This is because any such group is a nilpotent Lie group. For example, one can take the group of real numbers under addition, and the discrete, cocompact subgroup consisting of the integers. The resulting 1-step nilmanifold is the familiar circle $\R/\Z$. Another familiar example might be the compact 2-torus or Euclidean space under addition.

== Generalizations ==
A parallel construction based on solvable Lie groups produces a class of spaces called solvmanifolds. An important example of a solvmanifolds are Inoue surfaces, known in complex geometry.
