= Jack K. Hale =

American mathematician

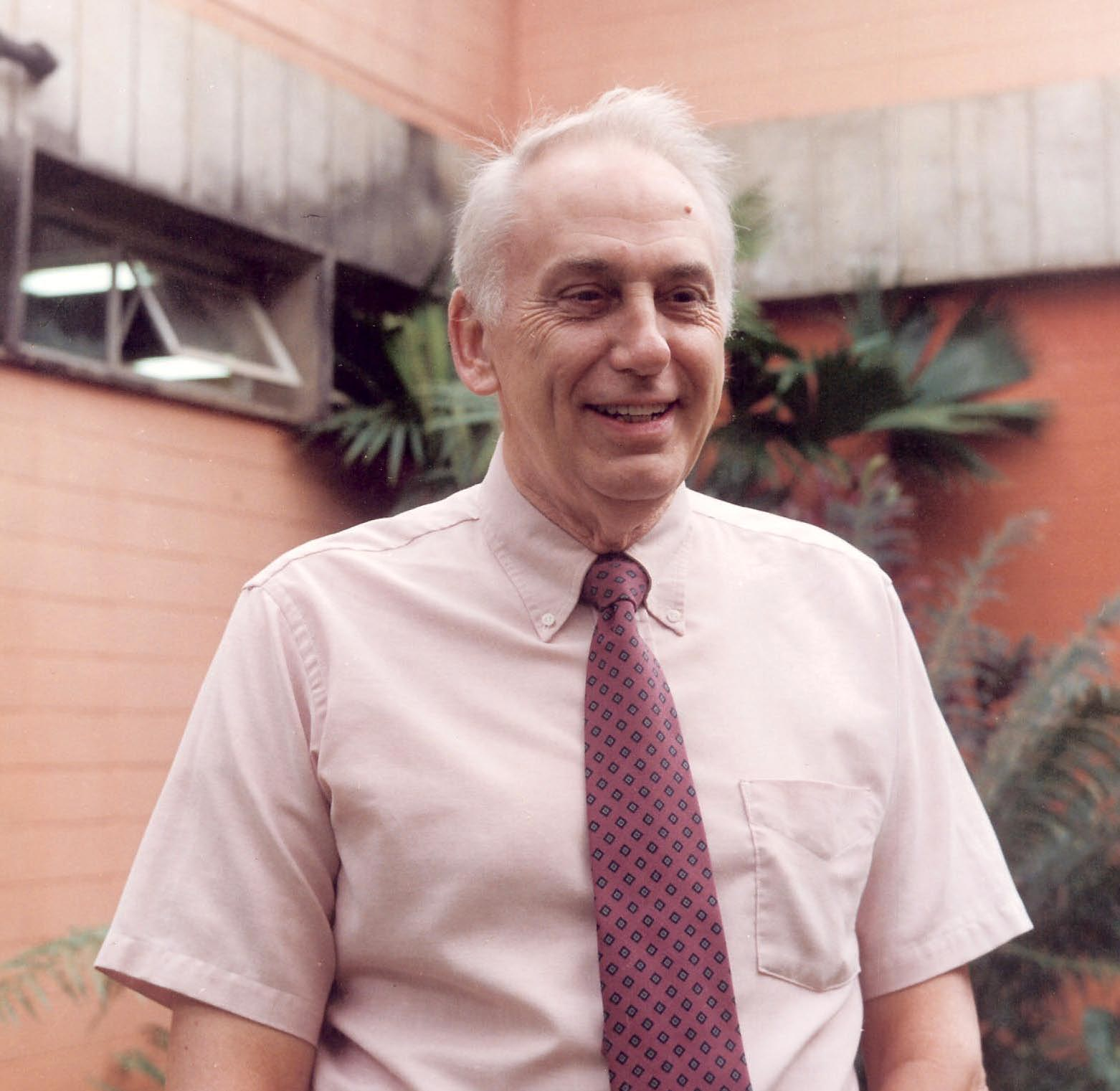
- Born: Jack Kenneth Hale; October 3, 1928; Carbon Glow, Kentucky, US
- Died: December 9, 2009 (aged 81); Atlanta, Georgia, US
- Education: Purdue University
- Awards: Chauvenet Prize (1965); Guggenheim fellowship (1979)
- Scientific career
- Fields: Applied mathematics and Dynamical systems and Control theory
- Workplaces: Brown University and Georgia Institute of Technology
- Doctoral advisor: Lamberto Cesari

Jack Kenneth Hale (3 October 1928 – 9 December 2009) was an American mathematician working primarily in the field of dynamical systems and functional differential equations.

== Biography ==
Jack Hale defended his Ph.D. thesis "On the Asymptotic Behavior of the Solutions of Systems of Differential Equations" at Purdue University under Lamberto Cesari in 1954; his undergraduate years were spent at Berea College, where he was studying Mathematics until 1949.

In 1954–57, Hale worked as a Systems Analyst at Sandia Corporation and in 1957–58 he was a staff scientist at Remington Rand Univac. During 1958–64, he was a permanent member of the Research Institute for Advanced Studies (RIAS) in Baltimore, Maryland. He became a faculty member at Brown University in 1964 and worked in the Division of Applied Mathematics for 24 years until 1988, serving as director of the Lefschetz Center for Dynamical Systems for a number of years. In 1988 Hale moved to the School of Mathematics at the Georgia Institute of Technology where he co-founded the Center for Dynamical Systems and Nonlinear Studies (CDSNS), serving as the director of the CDSNS from 1989 to 1998.

In 1964, together with Joseph LaSalle, Hale became the founding editor of the Journal of Differential Equations, of which he was later Chief Editor. The following year he shared the 1965 Chauvenet Prize with LaSalle for their exposition in the piece on Differential Equations: Linearity vs. Nonlinearity published in the SIAM Review. In 1999 he received an honorary doctorate from the University of Rostock (Germany).

Throughout his career, Hale published 15 books, over 200 research papers, and supervised 48 Ph.D. students. He was an Honorary Fellow of the Royal Society of Edinburgh, a Corresponding Member of the Brazilian Academy of Sciences, and a Foreign Member of the Polish Academy of Sciences. The biennial Jack K. Hale Award was established in 2013 by Elsevier with the aim of distinguishing researchers who have made outstanding contributions in the fields of dynamics and differential equations.

== Selected works ==
Books

- Hale, Jack (1977). Theory of functional differential equations. Applied Mathematical Sciences. Vol. 3 (Second edition of 1971 original ed.). New York–Heidelberg: Springer-Verlag. doi:10.1007/978-1-4612-9892-2. ISBN 978-1-4612-9894-6. MR 0508721. Zbl 0352.34001. Original edition published under title Functional differential equations.
- Hale, Jack K. (1980). Ordinary differential equations (Second edition of 1969 original ed.). Huntington, NY: Robert E. Krieger Publishing Co., Inc. ISBN 0-89874-011-8. MR 0587488. Zbl 0433.34003.
- Chow, Shui Nee; Hale, Jack K. (1982). Methods of bifurcation theory. Grundlehren der Mathematischen Wissenschaften. Vol. 251. New York–Berlin: Springer-Verlag. doi:10.1007/978-1-4613-8159-4. ISBN 0-387-90664-9. MR 0660633. Zbl 0487.47039.
- Hale, Jack K. (1988). Asymptotic behavior of dissipative systems. Mathematical Surveys and Monographs. Vol. 25. Providence, RI: American Mathematical Society. doi:10.1090/surv/025. ISBN 0-8218-1527-X. MR 0941371. Zbl 0642.58013.
- Hale, Jack K. (1992). Oscillations in nonlinear systems (Corrected reprint of the 1963 original ed.). New York: Dover Publications, Inc. ISBN 0-486-67362-6. MR 1206903. Zbl 0115.07401.
- Hale, Jack K.; Koçak, Hüseyin (1991). Dynamics and bifurcations. Texts in Applied Mathematics. Vol. 3. New York: Springer-Verlag. doi:10.1007/978-1-4612-4426-4. ISBN 0-387-97141-6. MR 1138981. Zbl 0745.58002.
- Hale, Jack K.; Verduyn Lunel, Sjoerd M. (1993). Introduction to functional-differential equations. Applied Mathematical Sciences. Vol. 99. New York: Springer-Verlag. doi:10.1007/978-1-4612-4342-7. ISBN 0-387-94076-6. MR 1243878. Zbl 0787.34002.
- Hale, Jack K.; Magalhães, Luis T.; Oliva, Waldyr M. (2002). Dynamics in infinite dimensions. Applied Mathematical Sciences. Vol. 47. With an appendix by Krzysztof P. Rybakowski (Second edition of 1984 original ed.). New York: Springer-Verlag. doi:10.1007/b100032. ISBN 0-387-95463-5. MR 1914080. Zbl 1002.37002. Original edition published under title An introduction to infinite-dimensional dynamical systems—geometric theory.

Articles

- Hale J.K., LaSalle J.P. (1963). "Differential Equations: Linearity vs. Nonlinearity" (PDF). SIAM Review. 5 (3): 249–272. Bibcode:1963SIAMR...5..249H. doi:10.1137/1005068. Archived from the original (PDF) on 2015-10-04.
- Hale J.K. (1969). "Dynamical Systems and Stability". Journal of Mathematical Analysis and Applications. 26 (1): 39–59. doi:10.1016/0022-247X(69)90175-9. hdl:2060/19680020679.
- Hale, J.K. "Linear Functional-Differential Equations with Constant Coefficients", RIAS Technical Report, 1963.
