= Rod Driver =

American politician (1932–2022)

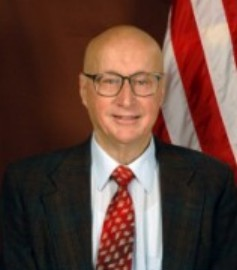

Member of the Rhode Island House of Representatives from the 52nd (1987–1995); 39th (2009–2011) district
- In office January 6, 1987 – January 3, 1995
- Preceded by: Donald R. Galloway (R-52)
- Succeeded by: Marguerite Bumpus (D-52)
- In office January 6, 2009 – January 4, 2011
- Preceded by: Joseph H. Scott (D-39)
- Succeeded by: Larry Valencia (D-39)

Personal details
- Born: Rodney David Driver; July 1, 1932 London, England
- Died: January 16, 2022 (aged 89) East Greenwich, Rhode Island, U.S.
- Party: Democratic
- Spouse: Carol J. Frandsen (m. 1955; died 2020)
- Children: 3
- Education: University of Minnesota
- Profession: Professor of mathematics University of Rhode Island

Rodney David Driver (July 1, 1932 – January 16, 2022) was a British-born American mathematician known for research on differential equations, and a former Democratic member of the Rhode Island House of Representatives. Between 1987 and 1995 he represented the towns of Richmond and Exeter in district 52. He was reelected on November 4, 2008, and represented the 39th District consisting of parts of Richmond, Exeter, and Charlestown from January 6, 2009, to January 4, 2011.

== Education and early career ==
Driver was born in London, England, on July 1, 1932, to William and Marjorie Driver. Rod was a U.S. citizen from birth via his father's citizenship. He and his family lived in London during the Battle of Britain and The Blitz beginning in 1940 but were fortunate in surviving the bombardment and widespread destruction of the city during the war. Shortly after V-E Day in 1945, the Driver family was able to travel to the United States where they established residency in Minneapolis, Minnesota. After high school, Rod studied at the University of Minnesota (UM), earning a B.S. in Electrical Engineering in 1953, and in 1955 he earned his M.S. in Electrical Engineering also at UM. Also in 1955 he and Carole Frandsen were married. Carole and Rod had three children, David, Karen and Bruce, before he completed his Ph.D. in Mathematics in 1960 at UM. Driver accepted a visiting appointment at the Research Institute for Advanced Studies in Baltimore, Maryland in 1960 and another at the Army Mathematics Research Center in Madison, Wisconsin in 1961 before joining the staff at Sandia National Laboratories in Albuquerque, New Mexico in 1962.

== Academic career ==
Driver joined the mathematics faculty at the University of Rhode Island in 1969, and was active at the university until his retirement from academia in 1998. His research involved delay differential equations and their applications, including the prediction and modeling of the path of ionic particles in electromagnetic fields. Driver authored three mathematics books and dozens of research papers. He has lectured in Europe as well as across the United States on his research into mathematics. His scientific society memberships included the American Mathematical Society and the Mathematical Association of America.

== Politics and public service ==
Since 1951, Driver devoted much effort toward peace and human rights in Southeast Asia, Latin America and the Middle East. He is a member of Amnesty International, the American Friends Service Committee, SEARCH for Justice and Equality in Palestine/Israel, and the Sierra Club.

In 1968, he ran in the Republican primary for Congress from New Mexico's 1st congressional district. He came in third place behind eventual winner Manuel Lujan Jr. and Schuble C. Cook. Driver's first electoral success was his election as a delegate to the 1986 Rhode Island Constitutional Convention. Driver's major contribution to the convention was a motion for a "neutral re-write" that converted a confusing 19,000-word draft document that included all stricken language from the previous 1843 Constitution and with all of its amendments upon amendments, to an 8,000-word readable constitution that is now in current use.

When the Constitutional Convention ended, Driver was elected to the Rhode Island House of Representatives, where he was the representative from District 52 (Richmond and Exeter) from 1987 to 1995. As a representative, he introduced legislation on recycling, water protection, commuter rail service and other environmental concerns. He routinely opposed proposed longer prison sentences for non-violent offenses, and he was a leader in the eventually-successful efforts to ban smoking in schools and to strengthen the law against selling tobacco products to children. And he became a vocal opponent of legalized gambling. Driver wrote the law which banned craps, blackjack, roulette and similar games in Rhode Island – creating a big hurdle for developers who wanted to build a full-fledged gambling casino in the state. In 1993 Driver was appointed to the House Finance Committee.

After leaving the legislature in January 1994, Driver was the volunteer executive director of the Government Accountability Project for the year 1995, and was active with Operation Clean Government in Rhode Island for several years. In 1998, 2000, 2002, and 2006, he ran unsuccessful runs for Congress from Rhode Island's 2nd congressional district. In 1998 and 2002, he ran in the Republican primaries coming in second place each time behind John O. Matson. In 2000 he ran unsuccessfully as an independent against James Langevin for the open seat vacated by Robert Weygand, coming in second place ahead of the Republican candidate and other independent candidates. In his 2006 race against Langevin, he was the only other candidate on the ballot and received 27% of the vote.

He was reelected to the Rhode Island House of Representatives on November 4, 2008, and has represented the 39th District consisting of parts of Richmond, Exeter, and Charlestown since January 6, 2009. During the 2009–2010 session, he served on the House Committee on Judiciary. In June 2010, he announced that he would not seek re-election in the 2010 elections.

Driver died at the St. Elizabeth Home in East Greenwich, Rhode Island, on January 16, 2022, at the age of 89.

== Selected publications ==
- Driver, R.D. 1962. "Existence and stability of solutions of a delay-differential system". Archive for Rational Mechanics and Analysis 10(1):401–426.
- Driver, R.D. 1965. "Existence and continuous dependence of solutions of a neutral functional-differential equation". Archive for Rational Mechanics and Analysis 19(2):149–166.
- Driver, R.D. and M.J. Norris. 1967. "Note on uniqueness for a one-dimensional two-body problem of classical electrodynamics". Annals of Physics 42(2):347–351.
- Driver, R.D. 1977. Ordinary and Delay Differential Equations. Springer Verlag, New York. 501pp. ISBN 0-387-90231-7
- Driver, R.D. 1978. Introduction to Ordinary Differential Equations. Harper and Row, New York. 340pp. ISBN 0-06-041738-2.
- Driver, R.D. 1979. "Can the future influence the present?" Physical Review D 19:1098–1107.
- M.J. Norris and R.D. Driver 1981. "A uniqueness theorem for ordinary differential equations". SIAM Journal on Mathematical Analysis 12(2):141–144.
- Driver, R.D. 1984. Why Math? Springer Verlag, New York. 233pp. ISBN 0-387-90973-7
- Driver, R.D., G. Ladas, and P.N. Vlahos. 1992. "Asymptotic behavior of a linear delay difference equation". Proceedings of the American Mathematical Society 115(1):106–112.
