= Roberto Conti (mathematician) =

Italian mathematician (1923–2006)

- Born: 29 April 1923; Florence, Italy
- Died: 30 August 2006 (aged 83); Florence, Italy
- Education: Scuola Normale Superiore di Pisa
- Known for: Comparison method
- Scientific career
- Fields: Mathematics
- Workplaces: University of Florence, University of Catania
- Doctoral advisor: Giovanni Sansone

Roberto Conti (23 April 1923 – 30 August 2006) was an Italian mathematician, who contributed to the theory of ordinary differential equations and the development of the comparison method.

== Biography ==
Roberto Conti was born in Florence on 29 April 1923. He obtained his M.Sc. and Ph.D. in mathematics from the Scuola Normale Superiore di Pisa, under the supervision, respectively, of Leonida Tonelli (replaced, after his premature death, by Emilio Baiada) and Giovanni Sansone. Conti’s M.Sc. and Ph.D. dissertations dealt with translation surfaces (possibly a topic suggested by Tonelli after knowing about some Russian works) and particular aspects of the Cauchy problem. Later he held the position of research assistant to the chair of Sansone at the University of Florence. Their collaboration was fruitful and resulted in numerous articles, as well as the book (Sansone & Conti 1964),(Sansone & Conti 1964) originally published in Italian, which was translated into a number of languages and became one of the standard texts on the subject in the 1960s. In 1956 Conti became full professor at the University of Catania, holding the chair of mathematical analysis until 1958, when he returned to Florence. In 1963-1964 he held a visiting professorship at the Research Institute for Advanced Studies (RIAS) in Baltimore, Maryland.

His research focused on several topics, which often overlapped in the time and contributed to motivate each other. A leading theme was constituted by functional analysis and its applications to the theory of ordinary differential equations, dynamical systems and control systems. An impulse to do research on control systems was most probably given by his discussions with the Russian engineer and mathematician Nicolas Minorsky, who first proposed application of control theory to the automatic steering of ships. Minorsky, after the Russian Revolution, moved to U.S. and later to southern France: during that period he came frequently to Florence, to give seminars and exchange mathematical ideas with Sansone and Conti. On another hand, Conti’s contributions to the development of the comparison method for the qualitative analysis of differential equations were particularly prominent. He was a corresponding member of the Accademia dei Lincei since 1983 and a full member since 1994, a foreign honorary member of the Romanian Academy since 1997 and was also a member of the editorial board of the Journal of Differential Equations since its inception in 1964 until his death in 2006.

== Selected works ==
=== Books and book chapters ===
- Sansone, Giovanni; Conti, Roberto (1956), Equazioni differenziali non lineari, Monografie matematiche del Consiglio Nazionale delle Ricerche (in Italian), vol. 3, Roma: Edizioni Cremonese, pp. XIX+647, MR 0088607, Zbl 0075.26803, translated in English as Sansone, Giovanni; Conti, Roberto (1964), Nonlinear Differential Equations (PDF), International Series of Monographs in Pure and Applied Mathematics, vol. 67, translated by Diamond, Ainsley H., Oxford–London–Edinburg–New York–Paris–Frankfurt: Pergamon Press, pp. XIII+533, ISBN 978-0080101941, MR 0177153, Zbl 0128.08403, archived from the original (PDF) on 1 July 2016
- Reissig, Rolf; Sansone, Giovanni; Conti, Roberto (1964), Qualitative Theorie nichtlineare Differentialgleichungen [Qualitative Theory of Nonlinear Differential Equations] (in German), Roma: Edizioni Cremonese, pp. XXXII+382, MR 0158121, Zbl 0114.04302.
- Reissig, Rolf; Sansone, Giovanni; Conti, Roberto (1969), Nichtlineare Differentialgleichungen höherer Ordnung, Monografie matematiche del Consiglio Nazionale delle Ricerche (in German), vol. 16, Roma: Edizioni Cremonese, pp. XV+738, MR 0241749, Zbl 0172.10801, translated in English as Reissig, Rolf; Sansone, Giovanni; Conti, Roberto (1974), Non-linear differential equations of higher order, Monographs and Textbooks on Pure and Applied Mathematics, Leyden: Noordhoff International Publishing, pp. xiii+669, ISBN 90-01-75270-5, MR 0344556, Zbl 0275.34001.
- Conti, Roberto (1977), Problemi di Controllo e di Controllo Ottimale, Collezione di matematica applicata (in Italian), vol. 6 (3 ed.), Turin: Unione Tipografico-Editrice Torinese, p. 239, ISBN 9788802019468
- Conti, Roberto (1977), Linear Differential Equations and Control, Institutiones Mathematicae, vol. 1, Rome / London–New York: Istituto Nazionale di Alta Matematica / Academic Press, p. 174, ISBN 978-0123636010, MR 0513642, Zbl 0356.34007.
- Conti, Roberto; Galeotti, Marcello (2000), "Chapter 2: Totally Bounded Cubic Systems in ℝ^{2}", in Macki, J. W.; Zecca, P. (eds.), Dynamical Systems. Lectures given at the C.I.M.E. Summer School held in Cetraro, Italy, June 19-26, 2000, Lecture Notes in Mathematics, vol. 1822, Springer, pp. 103–172, doi:10.1007/978-3-540-45204-1_2, ISBN 3-540-40786-3, MR 2051723, Zbl 1048.37043.

=== Articles ===
- Conti, Roberto (1955), "Sulla stabilità dei sistemi di equazioni differenziali lineari" [On the stability of systems of linear differential equations] (PDF), Rivista di Matematica della Università di Parma, (1) (in Italian), 6: 5–35, MR 0076953, Zbl 0067.31402.
- Conti, Roberto (1956), "Limitazioni "in ampiezza" delle soluzioni di un sistema di equazioni differenziali e applicazioni" ["Amplitude" limitations of the solutions to a system of differential equations and their applications], Bollettino dell'Unione Matematica Italiana, Serie III (in Italian), 11 (3): 334–349, MR 0080829, Zbl 0071.30601.
- Conti, Roberto (1956a), "Sulla prolungabilità delle soluzioni di un sistema di equazioni differenziali ordinarie" [On the continuability of solutions to a system of ordinary differential equations], Bollettino dell'Unione Matematica Italiana, Serie III (in Italian), 11 (4): 510–514, MR 0083628, Zbl 0072.30403.
- Conti, Roberto (1957), "Sulla t_{∞}–similitudine tra matici e l'equivalenza asintotica dei sistemi differenziali lineari" [On the t_{∞}–similitude between matrices and the asymptotic equivalence of linear differential systems] (PDF), Rivista di Matematica della Università di Parma, (1) (in Italian), 8: 43–47, MR 0098870, Zbl 0089.29702.
- Conti, Roberto (1965), "Contributions to linear control theory", Journal of Differential Equations, 1 (4): 427–445, Bibcode:1965JDE.....1..427C, doi:10.1016/0022-0396(65)90003-3, MR 0227518, Zbl 0152.08401
- Conti, Roberto (1966), "On the boundedness of solutions of ordinary differential equations" (PDF), Funkcialaj Ekvacioj, 9: 23–26, MR 0080829, Zbl 0071.30601.
- Conti, Roberto (1967), "Recent trends in the theory of boundary value problems for ordinary differential equations", Bollettino dell'Unione Matematica Italiana, Serie III, 22 (2): 135–178, MR 0218650, Zbl 0154.09101
- Conti, Roberto (1968), "On ordinary differential equations with interface conditions", J. Differential Equations, 4 (1): 4–11, Bibcode:1968JDE.....4....4C, doi:10.1016/0022-0396(68)90045-4.
- Conti, Roberto (1983), "Return sets of a linear control process", J. Optim. Theory Appl., 41 (1): 37–53, doi:10.1007/BF00934435, ISSN 0022-3239, S2CID 122611719.
- Conti, Roberto (1991), "Strictly stable linear ordinary differential equations and similarity" (PDF), Rivista di Matematica della Università di Parma, (4), 17: 217–220, MR 1174950, Zbl 0758.34005.
- Conti, Roberto (1998), "Centers of planar polynomial systems. A review", Le Matematiche, 53 (2): 207–240, MR 1710759, Zbl 1156.34315.
- Conti, Roberto; Galeotti, Marcello (2002), "Totally bounded differential polynomial systems in ℝ^{2}", Atti della Accademia Nazionale dei Lincei. Classe di Scienze Fisiche, Matematiche e Naturali. Rendiconti Lincei. Matematica e Applicazioni, Serie IX, 13 (2): 91–99, MR 1949482, Zbl 1108.34311.
