= Next of Kin (1989 film) =

1989 film by John Irvin

- Theatrical release poster
- Directed by: John Irvin
- Written by: Michael Jenning
- Produced by: Les Alexander; Don Enright
- Starring: Patrick Swayze; Adam Baldwin; Helen Hunt; Bill Paxton; Liam Neeson
- Cinematography: Steven Poster
- Edited by: Peter Honess
- Music by: Jack Nitzsche
- Production companies: Barry & Enright Productions; Lorimar Film Productions
- Distributed by: Warner Bros. Pictures
- Release date: October 20, 1989
- Running time: 108 minutes
- Country: United States
- Language: English
- Budget: $12 million
- Box office: $15,942,628

Next of Kin is a 1989 American neo-Western crime thriller film directed by John Irvin and written by Michael Jenning. It stars Patrick Swayze and Liam Neeson, with Adam Baldwin, Helen Hunt, Bill Paxton and Ben Stiller in one of his earliest roles. The film follows a Chicago Police Department detective originally from the Appalachian countryside of Kentucky investigating the murder of his younger brother by members of the Chicago Outfit. Meanwhile, his other brother sets out on his own mission of vengeance against the killers.

The film was released by Warner Bros. Pictures on October 20, 1989. It received mixed reviews from critics and was a commercial failure.

== Plot ==
Truman Gates, a former US Army Airborne Ranger raised in Appalachia, migrates to Chicago to become a detective for the Chicago Police Department. Married to Jessie, who is pregnant, he has made the transition from hillbilly to lawman. When the coal mine closes, Truman persuades his younger brother Gerald to get work in Chicago. Soon after Gerald lands a job as a truck driver, his vehicle is hijacked by mobsters and Gerald is killed by Joey Rosellini, the nephew of mob boss "Papa" John Isabella.

Truman returns to his hometown in rural Kentucky for the funeral. His surviving brother, Briar Gates, insists on a traditional mountain blood feud and searches for his brother's killer in Chicago.

Meanwhile, Truman tries to solve the crime before Briar can take revenge. Approaching Papa John, he suggests that Gerald's murderer surrender to save them both trouble. John refuses, and Truman is left to continue his investigation. After arriving in town, Briar gets a room at a flop house. He gives the front desk clerk, Harold, his cousin Hollis' number back home, asking him to call it if Briar doesn't return by morning.

Briar goes looking for information on Gerald's killer, shooting up a local mob hangout in the process. Truman arrives a little later. Joey, embarrassed by the attack, says he will not press charges against Briar, intending to "handle things" himself. Working together, Briar and Truman discover who the hijackers were from a witness. Truman tries to talk Lawrence, the son of Papa John, into turning state's evidence against Joey since he was present when Joey killed Gerald. Lawrence goes to Joey for help, but Joey, jealous of Lawrence, kills him. Lawrence's body is found, having been tortured and burned, with Briar's shotgun planted at the scene.

Joey goes to Papa John, who sanctions a hit on the supposed culprit. Briar breaks into Rosellini's trucking company and engages in a gunfight with Joey's crew. He kills two of them before Joey shoots Briar twice. Fatally wounded, Briar dies in Truman's arms. When Harold sees a news report on TV about the deaths at the trucking company, he calls the number Briar gave him.

Truman resigns from the police force to go after the Rosellini mob. As the Gates family travels to Chicago to begin a war against the Outfit, Truman throws one of Joey's guys through the window of a restaurant. When Joey comes out, he finds "You forgot one" painted on his car, and he vows to kill Truman without Papa John's permission.

Truman lures the Rosellini crew to a darkened cemetery, where an extended battle ensues, including the arrival of the Gates clan. In the end, Truman has Joey pinned on the ground with a knife to his throat, only to be stopped when Papa John arrives with members of the Gates family held at gunpoint. Having learned the truth about Lawrence's murder, he fatally shoots Joey. The Gates and Isabella families call a truce. Back at the police station, Truman finds Jessie and tells her, "You're my family."

== Cast ==
- Patrick Swayze as Detective Truman Gates
- Liam Neeson as Briar Gates
- Adam Baldwin as Joey Rosselini
- Helen Hunt as Jessie Gates
- Andreas Katsulas as Johnny "Papa John" Isabella
- Bill Paxton as Gerald Gates
- Ben Stiller as Lawrence Isabella
- Michael J. Pollard as Harold
- Ted Levine as Willy Simpson
- Del Close as Frank
- Valentino Cimo as Rhino
- Paul Greco as Leo
- Vincent Guastaferro as Paulie
- Paul Herman as Lieutenant Tony Antonelli
- Don James as David Jenkins
- Brett Hadley as De Witt Gates
- Rodney Hatfield as Hollis Gates
- Richard Wharton as Selkirk Gates
- Kelly Blair as Tolbert Gates
- Charles Williams as Pierce Gates
- Michael Wise as Snakeman Gates
- Joseph R. Ryan as Grandpa Gates
- Starla Fugate as Gerald's Girlfriend
- Neil Giuntoli as Shorty
- Tim Quill as Reporter
- Sally Murphy as Hooker
- Lisa Niemi as Violinist (uncredited)

== Production ==
Next of Kin was the last film produced by Lorimar Productions before it acquisition by Warner Bros. Pictures.

=== Filming ===
Principal photography took place on-location in Chicago and throughout the Appalachia region of Kentucky. Some of the home scenes and the opening scenes were filmed in the small Perry County, Kentucky coal camp of Hardburly. Others were done at the M.C. Napier High School gym in Hazard and in Letcher County near Carbon Glow.

Production of the film contributed to a Satanic panic in Eastern Kentucky, when members of the Hazard community contacted the police chief of Jackson, Kentucky regarding 20 black dresses that had been purchased from a local department store, presumably to be used in a satanic ritual. It was later determined that the dresses were repurposed as cloth for movie lighting.

== Reception ==
On the review aggregator website Rotten Tomatoes, 50% of 10 critics' reviews are positive. Metacritic, which uses a weighted average, assigned the film a score of 53 out of 100, based on 12 critics, indicating "mixed or average" reviews.

Critic Brian Orndorf wrote, "Next of Kin isn't a dazzling picture, but there's personality about it that eases the blow of idiocy, keeping the adventure of Truman Gates, redneck cop, alive and well." Film critics Siskel and Ebert, in particular, were not impressed with the film, including it on their "Worst of 1989" episode of At the Movies. Roger Ebert described the scene where the women are preparing lunch for the men getting ready for combat as "desperation time at the old screenwriting factory". Gene Siskel mocked the bow and arrow fight at the climax, suggesting that it might have had more impact had it been shot in the daytime instead of night.

In Sweden, the film was retitled Dirty Fighting (in English) to capitalize on Patrick Swayze's earlier success with Dirty Dancing. The film has since become a cult classic.

=== Accolades ===
At the 10th Golden Raspberry Awards, Swayze was nominated as Worst Actor for this film (also for Road House). He lost to William Shatner in Star Trek V: The Final Frontier.

== Soundtrack ==
A soundtrack to the film was also released through Columbia Records. The track listing is as follows:

1. "Brother to Brother" - Gregg Allman & Lori Yates - 3:58
2. "Hey, Backwoods" - Rodney Crowell - 4:11
3. "Hillbilly Heart" - Ricky Van Shelton - 2:56
4. "Straight and Narrow" - Ricky Skaggs - 2:51
5. "Paralyzed" - Sweethearts of the Rodeo - 3:00
6. "The Yard Sale" - Billy Lawson - 2:24
7. "My Sweet Baby's Gone" - Charlie Daniels - 3:15
8. "Pyramid of Cans" - George Jones - 2:31
9. "Brothers" - Patrick Swayze & Larry Gatlin - 4:10
10. "Wailing Sax" - Duane Eddy - 3:19
