= Roberto Conti =

Roberto Conti may refer to:

- Roberto Conti (cyclist)
- Roberto Conti (mathematician)
