= LaSalle's invariance principle =

Concept in theory of differential equations

LaSalle's invariance principle (also known as the invariance principle, Barbashin-Krasovskii-LaSalle principle, or Krasovskii-LaSalle principle) is a criterion for the asymptotic stability of an autonomous (possibly nonlinear) dynamical system.

== Global version ==
Suppose a system is represented as

$$\dot{\mathbf{x}} = f \left(\mathbf x \right)$$

where $\mathbf x$ is the vector of variables, with

$$f \left( \mathbf 0 \right) = \mathbf 0.$$

If a $C^1$(see Smoothness) function $V(\mathbf x)$ can be found such that

$\dot{V}(\mathbf x) \le 0$ for all $\mathbf x$ (negative semidefinite),

then the set of accumulation points of any trajectory is contained in ${\mathcal I}$ where ${\mathcal I}$ is the union of complete trajectories contained entirely in the set $\{\mathbf x : \dot{V}( \mathbf x) = 0 \}$.

If we additionally have that the function $V$ is positive definite, i.e.

$V( \mathbf x) > 0$, for all $\mathbf x \neq \mathbf 0$
$$V( \mathbf 0) = 0$$

and if ${\mathcal I}$ contains no trajectory of the system except the trivial trajectory $\mathbf x(t) = \mathbf 0$ for $t \geq 0$, then the origin is asymptotically stable.

Furthermore, if $V$ is radially unbounded, i.e.

$V(\mathbf x) \to \infty$, as $\Vert \mathbf x \Vert \to \infty$

then the origin is globally asymptotically stable.

== Local version ==
If

$V( \mathbf x) > 0$, when $\mathbf x \neq \mathbf 0$
$$\dot{V}(\mathbf x) \le 0$$

hold only for $\mathbf x$ in some neighborhood $D$ of the origin, and the set

$$\{ \dot{V}( \mathbf x) = 0 \} \cap D$$

does not contain any trajectories of the system besides the trajectory $\mathbf x(t)=\mathbf 0, t \geq 0$, then the local version of the invariance principle states that the origin is locally asymptotically stable.

== Relation to Lyapunov theory ==
If $\dot{V} ( \mathbf x)$ is negative definite, then the global asymptotic stability of the origin is a consequence of Lyapunov's second theorem. The invariance principle gives a criterion for asymptotic stability in the case when $\dot{V}(\mathbf x)$ is only negative semidefinite.

== Examples ==
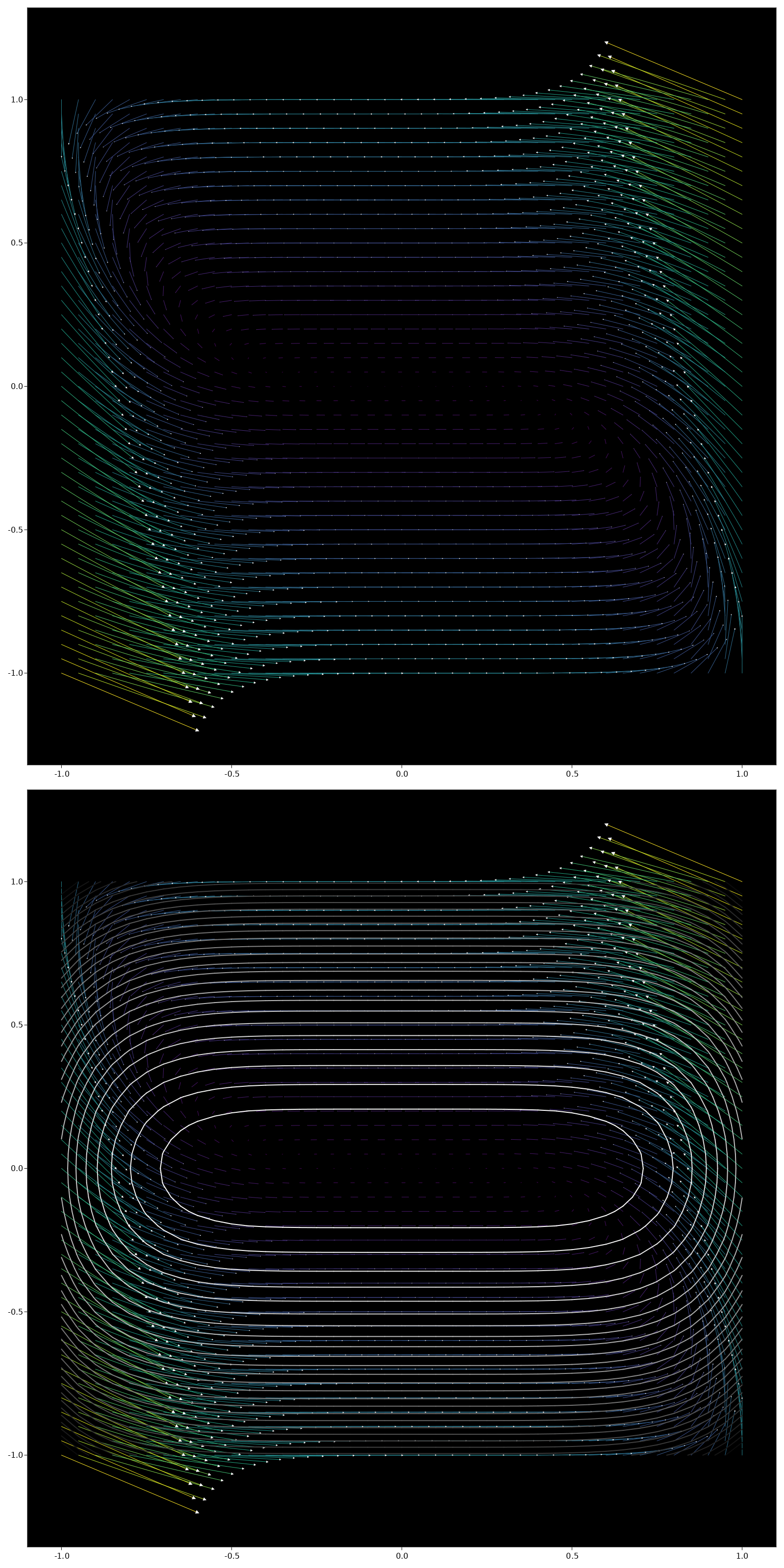
A plot of vector field $(\dot x, \dot y) = (-y-x^3, x^5)$ and Lyapunov function $V(x, y) = x^6 + 3y^2$.

=== Simple example ===
Example taken from "LaSalle's Invariance Principle, Lecture 23, Math 634", by Christopher Grant.

Consider the vector field $(\dot x, \dot y) = (-y-x^3, x^5)$ in the plane. The function $V(x, y) = x^6 + 3y^2$ satisfies $\dot V = -6x^8$, and is radially unbounded, showing that the origin is globally asymptotically stable.

=== Pendulum with friction ===
This section will apply the invariance principle to establish the local asymptotic stability of a simple system, the pendulum with friction. This system can be modeled with the differential equation

$$m l \ddot{\theta} = - m g \sin \theta - k l \dot{\theta}$$

where $\theta$ is the angle the pendulum makes with the vertical normal, $m$ is the mass of the pendulum, $l$ is the length of the pendulum, $k$ is the friction coefficient, and g is acceleration due to gravity.

This, in turn, can be written as the system of equations

$$\dot{x}_1 = x_2$$

$$\dot{x}_2 = -\frac{g}{l} \sin x_1 - \frac{k}{m} x_2$$

Using the invariance principle, it can be shown that all trajectories that begin in a ball of certain size around the origin $x_1 = x_2 = 0$ asymptotically converge to the origin. We define $V(x_1,x_2)$ as

$$V(x_1,x_2) = \frac{g}{l} (1 - \cos x_1) + \frac{1}{2} x_2^2$$

This $V(x_1,x_2)$ is simply the scaled energy of the system. Clearly, $V(x_1,x_2)$ is positive definite in an open ball of radius $\pi$ around the origin. Computing the derivative,

$$\dot{V}(x_1,x_2) = \frac{g}{l} \sin x_1 \dot{x}_1 + x_2 \dot{x}_2 =  - \frac{k}{m} x_2^2$$

Observe that $V(0) = 0$ and $\dot{V}(0) = 0$. If it were true that $\dot{V} < 0$, we could conclude that every trajectory approaches the origin by Lyapunov's second theorem. Unfortunately, $\dot{V} \leq 0$ and $\dot{V}$ is only negative semidefinite since $x_1$ can be non-zero when $\dot{V}=0$. However, the set

$$S = \{ (x_1,x_2) | \dot{V}(x_1,x_2) = 0 \}$$

which is simply the set

$$S = \{ (x_1,x_2) | x_2 = 0 \}$$

does not contain any trajectory of the system, except the trivial trajectory $x =0$. Indeed, if at some time $t$, $x_2(t)=0$, then because $x_1$ must be less than $\pi$ away from the origin, $\sin x_1 \neq 0$ and $\dot{x}_2(t) \neq 0$. As a result, the trajectory will not stay in the set $S$.

All the conditions of the local version of the invariance principle are satisfied, and we can conclude that every trajectory that begins in some neighborhood of the origin will converge to the origin as $t \rightarrow \infty$.

== History ==
The general result was independently discovered by J.P. LaSalle (then at RIAS) and N.N. Krasovskii, who published in 1960 and 1959 respectively. While LaSalle was the first author in the West to publish the general theorem in 1960, a special case of the theorem was communicated in 1952 by Barbashin and Krasovskii, followed by a publication of the general result in 1959 by Krasovskii.

== See also ==
- Stability theory
- Lyapunov stability

== Original papers ==
- LaSalle, J.P. Some extensions of Liapunov's second method, IRE Transactions on Circuit Theory, CT-7, pp. 520–527, 1960. (PDF)
- Barbashin, E. A.; Nikolai N. Krasovskii (1952). Об устойчивости движения в целом [On the stability of motion as a whole]. Doklady Akademii Nauk SSSR (in Russian). 86: 453–456.
- Krasovskii, N. N. Problems of the Theory of Stability of Motion, (Russian), 1959. English translation: Stanford University Press, Stanford, CA, 1963.

== Text books ==
- LaSalle, J.P.; Lefschetz, S. (1961). Stability by Liapunov's direct method. Academic Press.
- Haddad, W.M.; Chellaboina, VS (2008). Nonlinear Dynamical Systems and Control, a Lyapunov-based approach. Princeton University Press. ISBN 9780691133294.
- Teschl, G. (2012). Ordinary Differential Equations and Dynamical Systems. Providence: American Mathematical Society. ISBN 978-0-8218-8328-0.
- Wiggins, S. (2003). Introduction to Applied Nonlinear Dynamical Systems and Chaos (2 ed.). New York City: Springer Verlag. ISBN 0-387-00177-8.

== Lectures ==
- Texas A&M University notes on the invariance principle (PDF)
- NC State University notes on LaSalle's invariance principle (PDF).
- Caltech notes on LaSalle's invariance principle (PDF).
- MIT OpenCourseware notes on Lyapunov stability analysis and the invariance principle (PDF).
