= SDSS J1001+5027 =

Gravitationally lensed quasar located in constellation Ursa Major

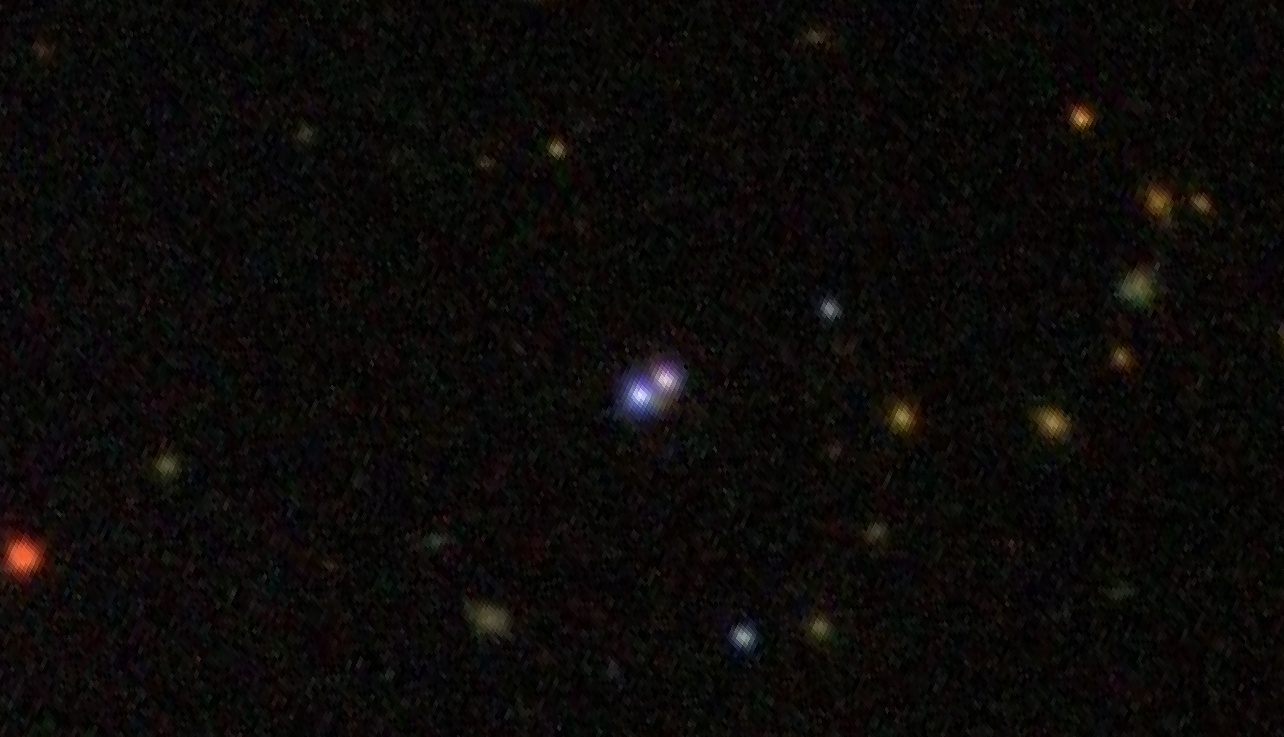
- Gravitationally lensed quasar SDSS J1001+5027, as seen through SDSS.

Observation data (J2000.0 epoch)
- Constellation: Ursa Major
- Right ascension: 10^{h} 01^{m} 28.61^{s}
- Declination: +50° 27′ 56.90″
- Redshift: 1.841318
- Heliocentric radial velocity: 552,013 km/s
- Distance: 9.899 Gly
- Apparent magnitude (V): 17.70
- Apparent magnitude (B): 17.90

Characteristics
- Type: HiBAL

Other designations
- 2MASX J10012847+5027573, SDSS J100128.61+502756.8, LQAC 150+050 007, LAMOST J100128.61+502756.8, PGC 3509563

SDSS J1001+5027 is a gravitationally lensed quasar located in the constellation of Ursa Major. The redshift of the object is (z) 1.841 and was discovered in March 2005 by Masamune Oguri during the Sloan Digital Sky Survey along with another lensed quasar, SDSS J120629.65+433217.6 (SDSS 1206+4332).

== Description ==
SDSS J1001+5027 is described as a double imaged quasar. When imaged, the object is split into two components with a slightly large separation gap of 2.86 arcseconds and displaying a rich system of emission lines including cerium, triply ionized chromium and magnesium. The foreground lensing galaxy of SDSS J1001+5027 is estimated to lie at (z) 0.415 based on a study by Noahisa Inada published in 2012. A possible secondary lens galaxy and large galaxy density enhancement were also discovered, suggesting the contribution of the quasar's large image separation.

The R-band light curve monitoring observations conducted for more than six years, found that SDSS J1001+5027 has evidence of time-delays but however proven uncertain. Based combining results from five different methods, the time-delay is said to be -119.3 ± 3.3 days, with component A leading component B. Amir Aghamousa would later give a new time-delay estimate of 117 days for the quasar, based on the application of a mirror estimator in his study, published in 2017. An official time-delay estimate of 120.93 ± 1.015 days was finally given for the quasar in 2023 by astronomers utilizing a TD-CARMA Bayesian technique.

Additional information also showed, both of the components display strong variability; for instance component A had a large variability amplitude as high as 0.25 magnitude during observation periods conducted from 2006 to 2007. Optical data, also revealed both components underwent a steady decrease in brightness levels by around 0.2 magnitude during the first 200 days of observations with the Nordic Optical Telescope. Several other smaller variation features on short-scale, were shown on the curves in additional to both strong variability and decrease of brightness in the quasar.

It is found SDSS J1001+507 is a broad absorption-line quasar. When observed with Subaru Telescope, the spectrum of both quasar components display absorption profiles, described as variable with a rotational velocity of 18,000 kilometer per seconds and at a radial distance of 0.06 parsecs through assumption of Keplerian motion. Six narrow-line absorption systems were found in addition, located at various redshifts between 0.41 and 1.75, with the magnesium system being the only one to display time variability and a velocity shear of 30 kilometers per seconds. The quasar shows outflowing wind and has a supermassive black hole mass of 9.66 ± 0.06 M_{☉} with a source continuum size of (2.2 ± 0.3) × 10^{−3} parsecs. An accretion disk size of 4.6^{+10.5}_{-3.2} at rest frame of 1736Å via microlensing, has been calculated for the quasar.
