= Halanay inequality =

Theorem in Mathematics

Halanay inequality is a comparison theorem for differential equations with delay. This inequality and its generalizations have been applied to analyze the stability of delayed differential equations, and in particular, the stability of industrial processes with dead-time and delayed neural networks.

== Statement ==
Let $t_{0}$ be a real number and $\tau$ be a non-negative number. If $v: [t_{0}-\tau, \infty) \rightarrow \mathbb{R}^{+}$ satisfies
$$\frac{d}{dt} v(t) \leq-\alpha v(t)+\beta\left[\sup _{s \in[t-\tau, t]} v(s)\right],  t \geq t_{0}$$
where $\alpha$ and $\beta$ are constants with $\alpha>\beta>0$, then
$$v(t) \leq k e^{-\eta\left(t-t_{0}\right)}, t \geq t_{0}$$
where $k>0$ and $\eta>0$.

== See also ==
- Grönwall's inequality
