= Joseph P. LaSalle =

American mathematician

J. P. LaSalle
- Born: Joseph Pierre LaSalle; May 28, 1916; State College, Pennsylvania, United States
- Died: July 7, 1983 (aged 67); Little Compton, Rhode Island, United States
- Education: California Institute of Technology
- Known for: LaSalle's invariance principle; Bihari–LaSalle inequality
- Awards: Chauvenet Prize (1965); Guggenheim Fellowship (1975)
- Scientific career
- Fields: Mathematics, Dynamical Systems, Control theory
- Workplaces: University of Notre Dame, RIAS, Brown University
- Doctoral advisor: A.D.Michal

Joseph Pierre LaSalle (born 28 May 1916 in State College, Pennsylvania; died 7 July 1983 in Little Compton, Rhode Island) was an American mathematician specialising in dynamical systems and responsible for important contributions to stability theory, such as LaSalle's invariance principle which bears his name.

== Biography ==
Joseph LaSalle defended his Ph.D. thesis on ″Pseudo-Normed Linear Sets over Valued Rings″ at the California Institute of Technology in 1941. In 1946 he joined the Mathematics Department at the University of Notre Dame as an assistant professor and remained there until 1958, becoming a full professor in 1956. During a visit to Princeton in 1947–1948, LaSalle developed a deep interest in differential equations through his interaction with Solomon Lefschetz and Richard Bellman, with whom he developed a close friendship. From 1958 until 1964 LaSalle was based at the Research Institute for Advanced Studies (RIAS) in Baltimore, where he worked closely with Lefschetz and in 1960 published his extension of Lyapunov stability theory, known today as LaSalle's invariance principle.

In 1962-1963 he was President of the Society for Industrial and Applied Mathematics (SIAM) and was a member of its board of trustees in 1964–1967. In 1964 LaSalle founded the Journal of Differential Equations and served as its Editor-in-Chief until 1980. In 1964 he became the first director of the Center for Dynamical Systems at Brown University, where he was also the chairman of the Division of Applied Mathematics in 1968–1973.

Together with J. K. Hale, LaSalle was the recipient of the 1965 Chauvenet Prize for their article, ″Differential Equations: Linearity vs. Nonlinearity″, published in the SIAM Review. In 1975 he was awarded the Guggenheim Fellowship for applied mathematics.

== Works ==
Books

- LaSalle, Joseph P.; Lefschetz, Solomon (1961). Stability by Liapunov's Direct Method with Applications. Mathematics in science and engineering. Vol. 4. Academic Press.
- LaSalle, Joseph P. (1976). The Stability of Dynamical Systems. CBMS-NSF Regional Conference Series in Applied Mathematics. SIAM. doi:10.1137/1.9781611970432. ISBN 978-0-89871-022-9.
- LaSalle, Joseph P. (1986). The stability and control of discrete processes. Applied Mathematical Sciences. Vol. 62. Springer. ISBN 978-0387964119.
- Hermes, Henry; LaSalle, Joseph P. (1969). Functional Analysis and Time Optimal Control. Mathematics in Science and Engineering. Vol. 56. Academic Press. ISBN 978-0123426505.

Articles

- J. LaSalle (July 1949). "Uniqueness theorems and successive approximations". Annals of Mathematics. 50 (3): 722–730. doi:10.2307/1969559. JSTOR 1969559.
- LaSalle, J. P. (Dec 1960). "Some extensions of Liapunov's second method" (PDF). IRE Transactions on Circuit Theory . 7 (4). IEEE: 520–527. Bibcode:1960IRTCT...7..520L. doi:10.1109/TCT.1960.1086720. Archived from the original (PDF) on 2019-04-30.
- LaSalle, Joseph P.; Hale, Jack K. (July 1963). "Differential Equations: Linearity vs. Nonlinearity" (PDF). SIAM Review. 5 (3). SIAM: 249–272. Bibcode:1963SIAMR...5..249H. doi:10.1137/1005068. Archived from the original (PDF) on 2015-10-04.
- Bellman, R.E., LaSalle, J.P. On Non-Zero-Sum Games and Stochastic Processes, Project RAND Research Memorandum, RM-212, 19 August 1949. (URL)
- Bellman, R.E., Blackwell, D., LaSalle, J.P. Application of Theory of Games to Identification of Friend and Foe, Project RAND Research Memorandum, RM-197, 28 July 1949. (URL)
- LaSalle, J.P. Stability theory for ordinary differential equations, Journal of Differential Equations, volume 4, issue 1, pp. 57–65, 1968. (URL)
- LaSalle, J.P. An Invariance Principle in the Theory of Stability, Brown University, Center for Dynamical Systems, Technical Report 66–1, 1966. (PDF)
- LaSalle, J.P. Stability and Control, SIAM Journal of Control, 1962. (URL)
- LaSalle, J.P. Recent Advances in Liapunov Stability Theory, SIAM Review, vol. 6, no. 1, January 1964. (URL)
- LaSalle, J.P. The Second International Congress of IFAC on Automatic Control, SIAM Review, vol 6., no. 3, July 1964. (URL)
