= Stochastic Gronwall inequality =

Stochastic Gronwall inequality is a generalization of Gronwall's inequality and has been used for proving the well-posedness of path-dependent stochastic differential equations with local monotonicity and coercivity assumption with respect to supremum norm.

== Statement ==
Let $X(t),\, t\geq 0$ be a non-negative right-continuous $(\mathcal{F}_t)_{t\ge 0}$-adapted process. Assume that $A:[0,\infty)\to[0,\infty)$ is a deterministic non-decreasing càdlàg function with $A(0)=0$ and let $H(t),\,t\geq 0$ be a non-decreasing and càdlàg adapted process starting from $H(0)\geq 0$. Further, let $M(t),\,t\geq 0$ be an $(\mathcal{F}_t)_{t\ge 0}$- local martingale with $M(0)=0$ and càdlàg paths.

Assume that for all $t\geq 0$,

$X(t)\leq \int_0^t X^*(u^-)\,d A(u)+M(t)+H(t),$ where $X^*(u):=\sup_{r\in[0,u]}X(r)$.

and define $c_p=\frac{p^{-p}}{1-p}$. Then the following estimates hold for $p\in (0,1)$ and $T>0$:

- If $\mathbb{E} \big(H(T)^p\big)<\infty$ and $H$ is predictable, then $\mathbb{E}\left[\left(X^*(T)\right)^p\Big\vert\mathcal{F}_0\right]\leq \frac{c_p}{p}\mathbb{E}\left[(H(T))^p\big\vert\mathcal{F}_0\right] \exp \left\lbrace c_p^{1/p}A(T)\right\rbrace$;
- If $\mathbb{E} \big(H(T)^p\big)<\infty$ and $M$ has no negative jumps, then $\mathbb{E}\left[\left(X^*(T)\right)^p\Big\vert\mathcal{F}_0\right]\leq \frac{c_p+1}{p}\mathbb{E}\left[(H(T))^p\big\vert\mathcal{F}_0\right] \exp \left\lbrace (c_p+1)^{1/p}A(T)\right\rbrace$;
- If $\mathbb{E} H(T)<\infty,$ then $\displaystyle{\mathbb{E}\left[\left(X^*(T)\right)^p\Big\vert\mathcal{F}_0\right]\leq \frac{c_p}{p}\left(\mathbb{E}\left[ H(T)\big\vert\mathcal{F}_0\right]\right)^p \exp \left\lbrace c_p^{1/p} A(T)\right\rbrace}$;

== Proof ==
It has been proven by Lenglart's inequality.
