= Larry Valencia =

Member of the Rhode Island House of Representatives

Member of the Rhode Island House of Representatives from the 39th district
- In office January 2011 – December 2014
- Preceded by: Rod Driver
- Succeeded by: Justin K. Price

Personal details
- Born: July 29, 1958 (age 68)
- Party: Democratic
- Education: Charter Oak State College; St. John's University

Lawrence "Larry" M. Valencia (born July 29, 1958) is an American politician and a former Democratic member of the Rhode Island House of Representatives representing District 39 from January 2011 to December 2014.

== Education ==
Valencia earned his BS degree from Charter Oak State College and his MS from St. John's University.

== Elections ==
- 2016 Valencia failed in his bid to re-take the seat by losing to GOP member Justin Price by over 20%.
- 2014 Valencia lost his reelection bid to GOP member Justin Price by 14%.
- 2012 Valencia was unopposed for the September 11, 2012 Democratic Primary, winning with 271 votes and won the November 6, 2012 General election with 3,336 votes (53.5%) against Republican nominee Clay Johnson.
- 2010 When Representative Driver left the Legislature and left the seat open, Valencia was unopposed for the September 23, 2010 Democratic Primary, winning with 384 votes, and won the November 2, 2010 General election with 2,732 votes (51.4%) against Republican nominee Michael Picillo.
- 2008 When District 39 Republican Representative Joseph Scott retired and left the seat open, Valencia ran in the four-way September 23, 2008 Democratic Primary, but lost by 31 votes to Rod Driver, who won the November 4, 2008 General election against Republican nominee David Hathaway.
