= Bihari–LaSalle inequality =

Integral inequality

The Bihari–LaSalle inequality was proved by the American mathematician Joseph P. LaSalle (1916–1983) in 1949 and by the Hungarian mathematician Imre Bihari (1915–1998) in 1956. It is the following nonlinear generalization of Grönwall's lemma.

Let u and ƒ be non-negative continuous functions defined on the half-infinite ray [0, ∞), and let w be a continuous non-decreasing function defined on [0, ∞) and w(u) > 0 on (0, ∞). If u satisfies the following integral inequality,

$$u(t)\leq \alpha+ \int_0^t f(s)\,w(u(s))\,ds,\qquad t\in[0,\infty),$$

where $\alpha$ is a non-negative constant, then

$$u(t)\leq G^{-1}\left(G(\alpha)+\int_0^t\,f(s) \, ds\right),\qquad t\in[0,T],$$

where the function G is defined by

$$G(x)=\int_{x_0}^x \frac{dy}{w(y)},\qquad x \geq 0,\,x_0>0,$$

and G^{−1} is the inverse function of G and T is chosen so that

$$G(\alpha)+\int_0^t\,f(s)\,ds\in \operatorname{Dom}(G^{-1}),\qquad \forall \, t \in [0,T].$$
