= Cheng's eigenvalue comparison theorem =

Theorem in Riemannian geometry

In Riemannian geometry, Cheng's eigenvalue comparison theorem states in general terms that when a domain is large, the first Dirichlet eigenvalue of its Laplace–Beltrami operator is small. This general characterization is not precise, in part because the notion of "size" of the domain must also account for its curvature. The theorem is due to Cheng (1975b) by Shiu-Yuen Cheng. Using geodesic balls, it can be generalized to certain tubular domains (Lee 1990).

== Theorem ==
Let M be a Riemannian manifold with dimension n, and let B_{M}(p, r) be a geodesic ball centered at p with radius r less than the injectivity radius of p ∈ M. For each real number k, let N(k) denote the simply connected space form of dimension n and constant sectional curvature k. Cheng's eigenvalue comparison theorem compares the first eigenvalue λ_{1}(B_{M}(p, r)) of the Dirichlet problem in B_{M}(p, r) with the first eigenvalue in B_{N(k)}(r) for suitable values of k. There are two parts to the theorem:

- Suppose that K_{M}, the sectional curvature of M, satisfies

$$K_M\le k.$$

Then

$$\lambda_1\left(B_{N(k)}(r)\right) \le \lambda_1\left(B_M(p,r)\right).$$

The second part is a comparison theorem for the Ricci curvature of M:

- Suppose that the Ricci curvature of M satisfies, for every vector field X,

$$\operatorname{Ric}(X,X) \ge k(n-1)|X|^2.$$

Then, with the same notation as above,

$$\lambda_1\left(B_{N(k)}(r)\right) \ge \lambda_1\left(B_M(p,r)\right).$$

S.Y. Cheng used Barta's theorem to derive the eigenvalue comparison theorem. As a special case, if k = −1 and inj(p) = ∞, Cheng’s inequality becomes λ^{*}(N) ≥ λ^{*}(H^{n}(−1)) which is McKean’s inequality.

== See also ==
- Comparison theorem
- Eigenvalue comparison theorem
