= Giovanni Sansone =

Italian mathematician (1888–1979)

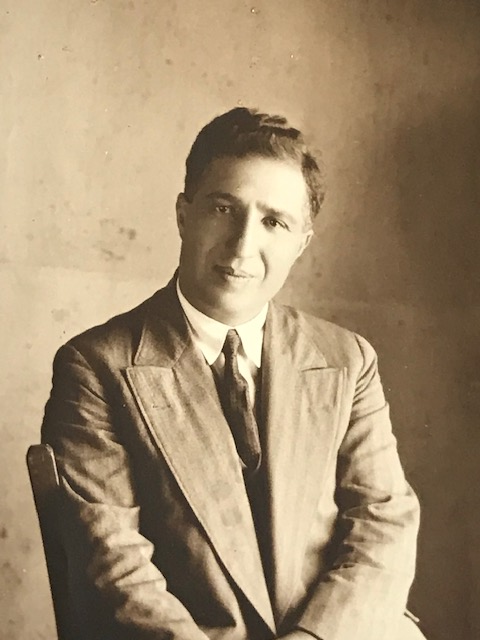
- Born: May 24, 1888; Porto Empedocle
- Died: October 13, 1979 (aged 91); Florence
- Scientific career
- Fields: Mathematical analysis Ordinary differential equations Orthogonal functions
- Institutions: University of Florence
- Doctoral advisor: Luigi Bianchi
- Notable students: Roberto Conti

Giovanni Sansone (24 May 1888 – 13 October 1979) was an Italian mathematician, known for his works on mathematical analysis, on the theory of orthogonal functions and on the theory of ordinary differential equations.

He was an Invited Speaker of the ICM in Bologna in 1928.

== Selected publications ==
- Sansone, Giovanni; Gerretsen, Johan (1960) [1947], Lectures on the theory of functions of a complex variable. I. Holomorphic functions, Groningen: Erven P. Noordhoff N.V., pp. xii+488, MR 0113988, Zbl 0093.26803.
- Sansone, Giovanni; Gerretsen, Johan (1969) [1947], Lectures on the theory of functions of a complex variable. II: Geometric theory, Groningen: Wolters-Noordhoff Publishing, pp. x+700, ISBN 978-90-286-0904-4, MR 0259072, Zbl 0188.38104.
- Sansone, Giovanni (1959) [1952], Orthogonal functions, Pure and Applied Mathematics, vol. 9, New York–London: Interscience Publishers, pp. xii+411, ISBN 978-0-486-66730-0, MR 0103368, Zbl 0084.06106.
- Sansone, Giovanni; Conti, Roberto (1956), Equazioni differenziali non lineari, Monografie matematiche del Consiglio Nazionale delle Ricerche (in Italian), vol. 3, Roma: Edizioni Cremonese, pp. XIX+647, MR 0088607, Zbl 0075.26803, translated in English as Sansone, Giovanni; Conti, Roberto (1964), Nonlinear Differential Equations (PDF), International Series of Monographs in Pure and Applied Mathematics, vol. 67, translated by Diamond, Ainsley H., Oxford–London–Edinburg–New York–Paris–Frankfurt: Pergamon Press, pp. XIII+533, ISBN 978-0080101941, MR 0177153, Zbl 0128.08403, archived from the original (PDF) on 2016-07-01
- Reissig, Rolf; Sansone, Giovanni; Conti, Roberto (1964), Qualitative Theorie nichtlineare Differentialgleichungen [Qualitative Theory of Nonlinear Differential Equations] (in German), Roma: Edizioni Cremonese, pp. XXXII+382, MR 0158121, Zbl 0114.04302.
- Reissig, Rolf; Sansone, Giovanni; Conti, Roberto (1969), Nichtlineare Differentialgleichungen höherer Ordnung, Monografie matematiche del Consiglio Nazionale delle Ricerche (in German), vol. 16, Roma: Edizioni Cremonese, pp. XV+738, MR 0241749, Zbl 0172.10801, translated in English as Reissig, Rolf; Sansone, Giovanni; Conti, Roberto (1974), Non-linear differential equations of higher order, Monographs and Textbooks on Pure and Applied Mathematics, Leyden: Noordhoff International Publishing, pp. xiii+669, ISBN 90-01-75270-5, MR 0344556, Zbl 0275.34001.
