= Paul Greco =

American actor

- Greco in The Warriors, 1979
- Born: October 21, 1955; Newark, New Jersey, U.S.
- Died: December 17, 2008 (aged 53); Red Hook, New York, U.S.
- Occupation: Actor
- Years active: 1979–2008

Paul Greco (October 21, 1955 – December 17, 2008) was an American actor. He was best known for playing Sully, the leader of the Orphans gang, in the 1979 film The Warriors.

Greco died from lung cancer in Red Hook, New York on December 17, 2008, at the age of 53.

== Filmography ==
Year	Title	Role	Notes
1979	The Warriors	Sully, Orphans leader	
1981	Four Friends	Car thief	
1984	Broadway Danny Rose	Vito Rispoli	
1986	Crocodile Dundee	New Yorker	
1988	The Last Temptation of Christ	Zealot	
1989	Next of Kin	Leo	
1989	Elvis Stories	Paxton Busby	Short
1991	Oscar	Schemer	
1996	If Lucy Fell	Rene	
1996	Love Is All There Is	Nunzio	
1996	The Cable Guy	Raul	
1997	Henry Fool	Concierge	
1997	To Die Quietly	Karate Boy	
