= Chaplygin's Theorem and Method for Solving ODE =

Differential comparison theorem

In mathematical theory of differential equations the Chaplygin Theorem states about the existence and uniqueness of the solution to an initial value problem for the first order explicit ordinary differential equation. This theorem was stated by Sergey Chaplygin in 1919. It is one of many comparison theorems. The Chaplygin Method is a method of solving an ordinary differential equation that fits the criteria of his theorem.

== Chaplygin's Theorem ==
Chaplygin's Theorem is focused on differential inequalities and how certain characteristics can be used.

Let us use the differential inequality $L[y]\equiv y^{m}+a_1(x)y^{m-1}+ \cdots + a_m(x)y > f(x)$.

Assume that all $a_i$ and $f$ are summable on the closed interval [x_{0},x_{1}]. Then there exists an $x^* \in (x_0,x_1]$ and an independent $f$, such that $y(x)>z(x), x_0<x\leq x^*$.

The conditions are as follows:

$$\begin{align}
\ L[z]=f(x) \\
\ z(x_0)= y(x_0) \cdots z^{n-1}(x_0) \\
\ x^*= max\{x \in [x_0,x_1] : \forall \phi \in [x_0,x], \forall h \in [\phi,x] \Rightarrow G(h;\phi) \geq 0\} \\
\end{align}$$.

In this situation $G(x;\phi)$ is the corresponding Cauchy Function, i.e. the solution of the equation $L[G]=0, \phi \leq x \leq x_1$, that satisfies the initial conditions: $G_{x=\phi}= \cdots = G_{x=\phi}^{m-2} =0, G_{x=\phi}^{m-1}=1$.

So, if we let m=1, the inequality $y''-y > f(x)$ yields x^{*}=x_{1}.

The other inequality, $y''+y>f(x)$ yields $x^*= min\{ x_1,x_0+\pi\}$.

There are similar statements that hold:

1) For weak inequalities;

2) When comparing $y^{k}(x)$ with $z^{k}(x)$, $k=1...(m-1)$;

3) When the initial conditions are of the form $y(x_0) \geq z(x_0)\cdots y^{n-1}(x_0) \geq z^{n-1}(x_0)$ and

4) Solutions of the inequality $(^*)$ with $x<x_0$.

== Chaplygin's Method ==
Consider the initial value Cauchy problem for a single equation of the first order:

$y'=f(x,y), (x,y) \in R, y(x_0)=y_0, R= \{(x,y): |x-x_0| \leq a, |y-y_0| \leq b$ (1). Chaplygin's Method of iterated approximations can be applied here. After confirming that the differential equations satisfy Chaplygin's Theorem mentioned above, one can apply his method.

Let y(x) be a solution of the initial value Cauchy problem.

Assume:

1) Curves $y=u(x)$ and $y=v(x)$ lie entirely inside the rectangle $R$,

2) Pass through the point $(x_0,y_0)$

3) For $x>x_0$ satisfies the inequalities: $u'(x)-f(x,u(x))<0, v'(x)-f(x,v(x))>0$.

If the assumptions are met, then for $x>x_0$, the following inequalities hold: $u_0(x)<y(x)<v_0(x)$ (2).

After finding the first approximation, Chaplygin's Method allows one to find a second, more closer approximation: $u_0(x)<u_1(x)<y(x)<v_1(x)<v_0(x)$ (3).

Consider the case where ${\partial^2f\over\partial y^2}$ is of fixed sign, (${\partial^2f\over\partial y^2} >0$ or ${\partial^2f\over\partial y^2} <0$), throughout $R$.

Then the pair $u_1(x),v_1(x)$, with the initial condition $y(x_0)=y_0$, can be obtained as the solution of the pair of linear differential equations.

Consider when ${\partial^2f\over\partial y^2} > 0$ in $R$. Then, when any plane x=constant intersects with the surface $z=f(x,y)$, the curve of the intersection is convex from below. This results in that any arc of that curve lies below the chord and above the tangent through any of its points.

Now, let us suppose that the equation of the tangent line for the intersection of the plane x=constant and curve $z=f(x,y)$ at the point $y=u_0(x)$ has 2 parts, the curve of the intersection and the chord.

1) The intersecting curve is given by $z=k(x)y+p(x)$, where $k(x)=f_y'(x,u_0(x)), P(x)=f(x,u_0(x))-u_0(x)k(x)$.

2) The equation of the chord of the same curve that goes through the points $y=u_0(x)$ and $y=v_0(x)$ is

$z=l(x)y+q(x)$, where $l(x)=\frac{f(x,v_0(x))-f(x,u_0(x))}{v_0(x)-u_0(x)}, q(x)=f(x,u_0(x))-u_0(x)l(x)$.

Then for that value of x the inequalities, $k(x)y+p(x)<f(x,y)<l(x)y+q(x)$ (4), hold.

Condition (4) is satisfied consistently for x in $R$.

Observe the 2 solutions that have been founded to the 2 initial value Cauchy problems.

1) The solution $y=u_1(x)$ to the initial value Cauchy problem $y'=k(x)y+q(x), y(x_0)=y_0$, and

2) The solution $y=v_1(x)$ to the initial value Cauchy problem $y'=l(x)y+p(x),y(x_0)=y_0$.

Both of these solutions satisfy the inequality conditions in equations (2) and (3).

After finding the pair $u_1(x),v_1(x)$, the same method can be applied to find a closer pair $u_2(x),v_2(x)$, and so on and so on.

The process of iterated approximations converges very quickly: $v_n-u_n \leq \frac{c}{2^{2^{n}}}$ (5), where the constant c is independent of x and n.

There is also a second way of constructing closer approximations $u_n(x),v_n(x)$ from known approximations $u_{n-1}(x),v_{n-1}(x)$.

This method doesn't require the sign of ${\partial^2f\over\partial y^2}$ to be fixed in $R$.

In this method:

$u_n(x)=u_{n-1}(x)+ \int_{x_0}^{x} e^{-k(x-t)}[f(t,u_{n-1}(t))-u_{n-1}'(t)]dt$

$v_n(x)=v_{n-1}(x)+ \int_{x_0}^{x} e^{-k(x-t)}[v_{n-1}'(t)-f(t,v_{n-1}(t))]dt$, where k is the Lipschitz constant of $f(x,y)$ in $R$.

In this case, the pairs $u_n(x),v_n(x)$ and $u_{n-1}(x),v_{n-1}(x)$ also satisfy the inequality condition (3) for all x.

However, the rate of convergence is less than that given by (5). So, although the second method has a more straightforward formula, many more iterations of approximations are needed to provide as an accurate result as the first method.

The main difficulty of Chaplygin's Method lies in the construction of the initial approximations $u_0(x),v_0(x)$.

A little reminder that can be used here is studying the concavity of $y'$. There are 2 situations.

1) When $y'$ is concave up (convex): the lower bound approximation can be the tangent line or the first terms from the Taylor Series expansion of $y'$. The upper bound approximation can be taken by finding the secant line.

2) When $y'$ is concave down: the lower bound approximation can be the secant line. The upper bound approximation can be the tangent line or the first terms of the Taylor Series.

Essentially, the basis of approximations is about tangent and secant lines, and Taylor Series expansions.

== Definitions ==
Consider an initial value problem: differential equation

$y'\left ( t \right ) = f\left ( t, y\left ( t \right ) \right )$ in $t \in \left [ t_0; \alpha \right ]$, $\alpha > t_{0}$

with an initial condition

$y\left ( t_{0} \right ) = y_{0}$.

For the initial value problem described above the upper boundary solution and the lower boundary solution are the functions $\overline{z}\left ( t \right )$ and $\underline{z}\left ( t \right )$ respectively, both of which are smooth in $t \in \left ( t_0; \alpha \right ]$ and continuous in $t \in \left [ t_0; \alpha \right ]$, such as the following inequalities are true:

1. $\underline{z}\left ( t_0 \right ) < y\left ( t_0 \right ) < \overline{z}\left ( t_0 \right )$;
2. $\underline{z}'\left ( t \right ) < f(t, \underline{z}\left ( t \right ))$ and $\overline{z}\ '\left ( t \right ) > f(t, \overline{z}\left ( t \right ))$ for $t \in \left ( t_0; \alpha \right ]$.

== Statement ==
Given the aforementioned initial value problem and respective upper boundary solution $\overline{z}\left ( t \right )$ and lower boundary solution $\underline{z}\left ( t \right )$ for $t \in \left [ t_0; \alpha \right ]$. If the right part $f\left ( t, y\left ( t \right ) \right )$

1. is continuous in $t \in \left [ t_{0}; \alpha \right ]$, $y\left ( t \right ) \in \left [ \underline{z} \left ( t \right ); \overline{z}\left ( t \right ) \right ]$;
2. satisfies the Lipschitz condition over variable $y$ between functions $\overline{z}\left ( t \right )$ and $\underline{z}\left ( t \right )$: there exists constant $K > 0$ such as for every $t \in \left [ t_{0}; \alpha \right ]$, $y_1 \left ( t \right ) \in \left [ \underline{z} \left ( t \right ); \overline{z}\left ( t \right ) \right ]$, $y_2 \left ( t \right ) \in \left [ \underline{z} \left ( t \right ); \overline{z}\left ( t \right ) \right ]$ the inequality

$\left \vert f\left ( t, y_{1}\left ( t \right ) \right ) - f\left ( t, y_{2}\left ( t \right ) \right ) \right \vert \le K \left \vert y_{1}\left ( t \right ) - y_{2}\left ( t \right ) \right \vert$ holds,

then in $t \in \left [ t_0; \alpha \right ]$ there exists one and only one solution $y\left ( t \right )$ for the given initial value problem and moreover for all $t \in \left [ t_0; \alpha \right ]$

$\underline{z}\left ( t \right ) < y\left ( t \right ) < \overline{z}\left ( t \right )$.

== Remarks ==
=== Weakening inequalities ===
Inside inequalities within both of definitions of the upper boundary solution and the lower boundary solution signs of inequalities (all at once) can be altered to unstrict. As a result, inequalities signs at Chaplygin's theorem conclusion would change to unstrict by $\overline{z}\left ( t \right )$ and $\underline{z}\left ( t \right )$ respectively. In particular, any of $\overline{z}\left ( t \right ) = y\left( t \right)$, $\underline{z}\left ( t \right ) = y\left( t \right)$ could be chosen.

=== Proving inequality only ===
If $y\left ( t \right )$ is already known to be an existent solution for the initial value problem in $t \in \left [ t_0; \alpha \right ]$, the Lipschitz condition requirement can be omitted entirely for proving the resulting inequality. There exists applications for this method while researching whether the solution is stable or not ( pp. 7–9). This is often called "Differential inequality method" in literature and, for example, Grönwall's inequality can be proven using this technique.

=== Continuation of the solution towards positive infinity ===
Chaplygin's theorem answers the question about existence and uniqueness of the solution in $t \in \left [ t_0; \alpha \right ]$ and the constant $K$ from the Lipschitz condition is, generally speaking, dependent on $\alpha$: $K = K\left ( \alpha \right )$. If for $t \in \left [ t_0; +\infty \right )$ both functions $\overline{z}\left ( t \right )$ and $\underline{z}\left ( t \right )$ retain their smoothness and for $\alpha \in \left ( t_0; +\infty \right )$ a set $\left\{ K\left ( \alpha \right ) \right\}$ is bounded, the theorem holds for all $t \in \left [ t_0; +\infty \right )$.

== Example of Applying Chaplygin's Method ==
Given: $y'(x)= e^{x^2}$, $y(x_0) = y_0$, find the first 2 iterations of approximations.

$Let: f(x,y)= e^{x^2}$and $x \in [0,X]$. Since f only depends on x, all 3 of our equations also will, L(x), M(x), and f(x).

We need to find L(x) and M(x) such that $L(x) \leq f(x) \leq M(x)$.

Let $u_n'(x)=L_n(x)$ and $v_n'(x)=M_n(x)$. So:

$$\begin{align}
u_1'(x) \leq \cdots \leq u_n'(x) \leq f(x) \leq v_n'(x) \leq \cdots \leq v_1'(x) \\
\\
u_1(x) \leq \cdots \leq u_n(x) \leq y(x) \leq v_n(x) \leq \cdots \leq v_1(x)
\end{align}$$
and $u_1(x_0)=y_0, v_1(x_0)=y_0$.

In general $L_1(x) \leq L_2(x) \leq {...} \leq L_n(x) \leq f(x) \leq M_n(x) \leq {...} \leq M_2(x) \leq M_1(x)$.

Finding the 1st Approximations:

To find L_{1}(x), we can refer to the Taylor Series expansion of $e^{x^2}$.

$$\begin{align}
e^{x^2} =
\sum_{n=0}^\infty \frac{x^{2n}}{n!} &= \frac{x^0}{0!} + \frac{x^1}{1!} + \frac{x^2}{2!} + \frac{x^3}{3!} + \frac{x^4}{4!} + \frac{x^5}{5!}+ \cdots \\
&= 1 + x + \frac{x^2}{2} + \frac{x^3}{6} + \frac{x^4}{24} + \frac{x^5}{120} + \cdots.
\end{align}$$

Since $x \geq 0$, take the first term of the expansion. That is, let L_{1}(x)=1.

To find M_{1}(x), we can investigate the bounds. Since $x \in [0,X]$, we can take the maximum value of our boundary. This gives us M_{1}(x)= $e^{X^2}$.

Now it is time for solve for the first 2 solutions:

For the first solution we have $L_1(x)=u_1'(x)=1$. So, $\int du_1(x) = \int 1 dx$. Thus, $u_1(x)= x + C_{L1}$.

Applying the initial condition, we get: $u_1(x)= x+(y_0-x_0)$.

For the second solution we have $M_1(x)= v_1'(x)= e^{X^2}$. So, $\int dv_1(x) = \int e^{X^2} dx$. Thus, $v_1(x)= xe^{X^2}+C_{M1}$.

Applying the initial condition, we get: $v_1(x)= xe^{X^2}+(y_0-x_0e^{X^2})$.

So, the result of the first iteration of approximations is: $[x+(y_0-x_0)] \leq y(x) \leq [xe^{X^2}+(y_0-x_0e^{X^2})]$.

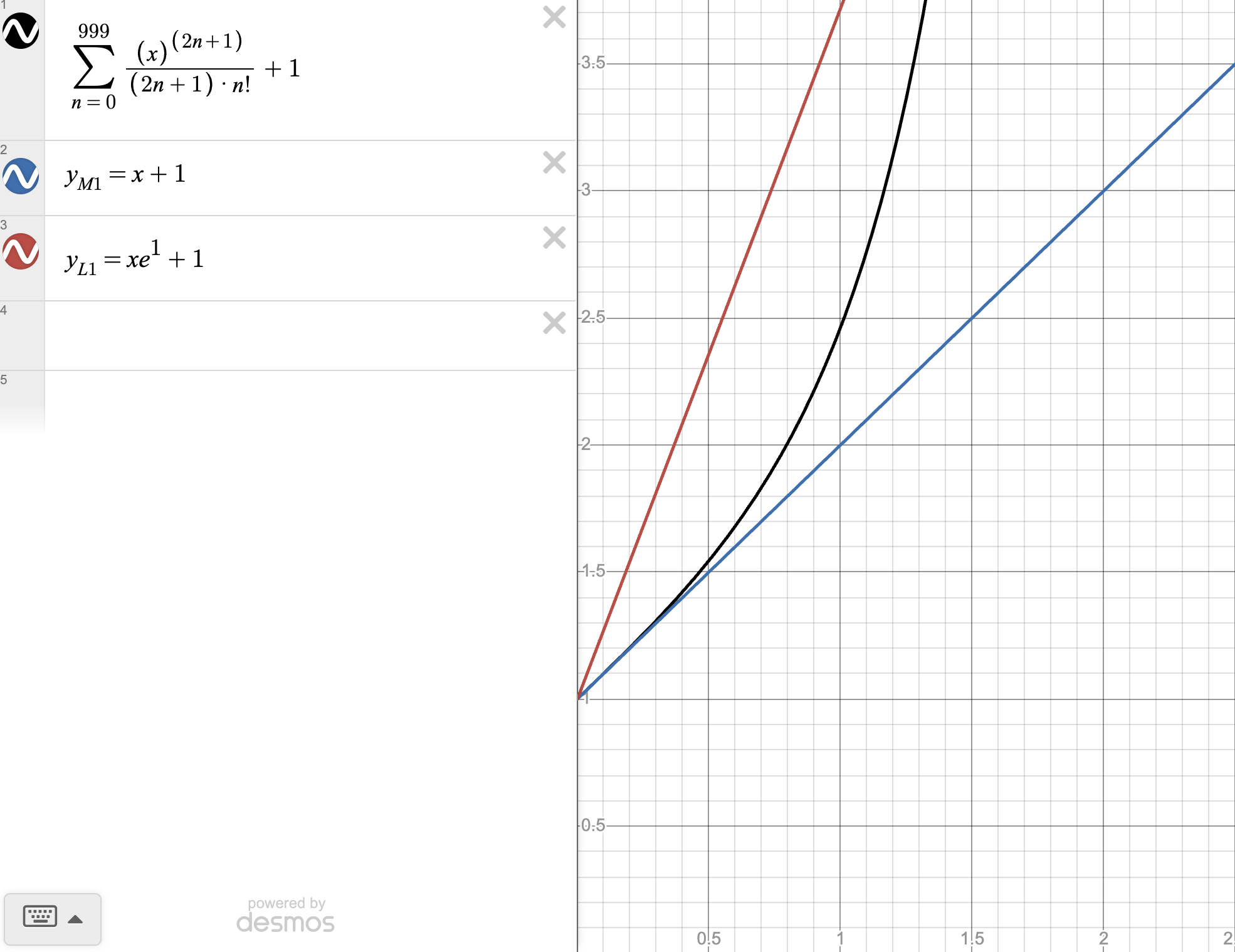
Figure 1: This is the example of lower and upper bound approximation for the first iteration of approximations for the integral of e^(x^2), where y(0)=1.

Finding the 2nd Approximations:

In order to find L_{2}(x), we can refer to the Taylor Series of $e^{x^2}$again. We can take the first 2 terms of the expansion.

So, $L_2(x)=1+x$. This is a valid approximation because $e^{x^2} \geq 1+x^2 \geq 1$.

We can generalize the lower bound approximation. Let us define $T_n(x)= \sum_{i=0}^n \frac{x^{2i}}{i!}$, and T_{n}(x) is the n^{th} Taylor Expansion. We can say that $L_{n+1}(x)= T_n(x)$. So the lower bound can be generalized in the following form:

$\int_{0}^{x} T_0(t)dt \leq \int_{0}^{x} T_1(t)dt \leq ... \leq \int_{0}^{x} T_{n-1}(t)dt \leq y(x)$.

At this point, it is time to use the Chaplygin Integrals listed in the method section. One should determine the Lipschitz constant and plug everything in correctly to the integral formula. Thus yielding an approximation of the differential equation.
