= Nikolay Krasovsky =

Russian mathematician (1924–2012)

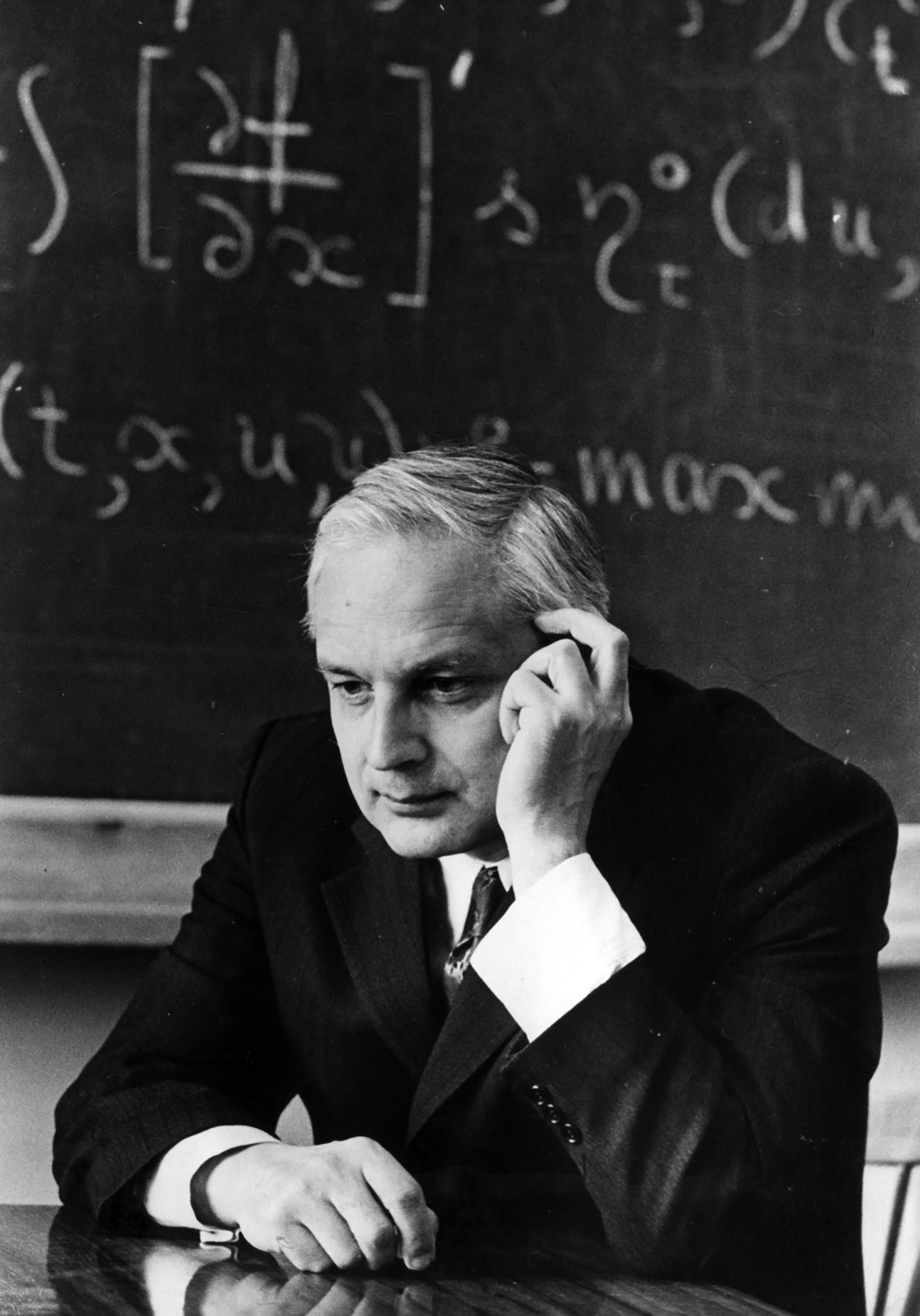
Academician Nikolay Nikolayevich Krasovsky

Nikolay Nikolayevich Krasovsky (Russian: Никола́й Никола́евич Красо́вский; 7 September 1924 – 4 April 2012, also transliterated Nikolai Krasovskii) was a Soviet and Russian mathematician who worked in the mathematical theory of control, the theory of dynamical systems, and the theory of differential games. He was the author of Krasovskii-LaSalle principle and the chief of the Ural scientific school in mathematical theory of control and the theory of differential games.

== Biography ==
Nikolay Krasovsky was born in Yekaterinburg (renamed later to Sverdlovsk that year) in the family of a doctor. In 1949, he graduated summa cum laude from the department of metallurgical science at the Ural State Technical University. In 1954, he presented his first thesis and received his Candidate of Sciences degree in mathematics. In 1957, he defended his second thesis for the degree of Doctor of Sciences and became a professor of mathematics.

From 1949 to 1959, he worked at the Ural State Technical University. Since 1958, he worked at the Ural State University.

- 1949–1951 – assistant at the Ural State Technical University
- 1954–1955 – associate professor (docent) at the Ural State Technical University
- 1958–1959 – professor at the Ural State Technical University
- 1959–1960 – chief of the chair of theoretical mechanics at the Ural State University
- 1961–1963 – chief of the chair of computing mathematics at the Ural State University

In 1963 Stanford University Press published a translation of his book Stability of Motion: applications of Lyapunov's second method to differential systems and equations with delay that had been prepared by Joel Lee Brenner.

- 1965–1970 – chief of the chair of applied mathematics at the Ural State University
- 1970–1977 – director the Institute of Mathematics and Mechanics of the Ural Branch of the Russian Academy of Sciences
- 1971–1986 – professor at the chair of applied mathematics at the Ural State University
- since 1986 until his death – professor of the chair of theoretical mechanics at the Ural State University
- Advisor of the Ural branch of the Russian Academy of Sciences

He died in Yekaterinburg aged 87, and was buried at the Shirokorechenskoye Cemetery.

== Honours ==
- Order of the Red Banner of Labour (1961)
- Academician of the Academy of Sciences of the Soviet Union (1968)
- Hero of Socialist Labour (1974)
- Order of Lenin (1974)
- Lenin Prize (1976) - for his work in mathematical control theory
- USSR State Prize (1984)
- Order of the October Revolution (1984)
- Honorary foreign member of the Hungarian Academy of Sciences (1988)
- Lyapunov Gold Medal of the Russian Academy of Sciences (1992)
- Doctor Honoris Causa of the Ural State Technical University (1994)
- Professor Emeritus of the Ural State University (1996)
- Lomonosov Gold Medal of the Russian Academy of Sciences (1996)
- Demidov Prize (1996)
- Order "For Merit to the Fatherland", 3rd class (1999)
- Vonsovsky Gold Medal of the Ural Branch of the Russian Academy of Sciences (2003)
- IEEE Control Systems Award (2003)
- Order "For Merit to the Fatherland", 2nd class (2004)
- Laureate of the Science Support Foundation in the category "Outstanding Scientists" (2006)
- The Issacs Award (2006)
- Honorary citizen of Yekaterinburg

== Sources ==
- Information (and photo) at server of Russian Academy of Science (in Russian): http://www.ras.ru/win/db/show_per.asp?P=.id-68.ln-ru
- "Control under Lack of Information" - Book of Krasovsky and his son, translated to English:
- List of publications (in English): https://web.archive.org/web/20060820152705/http://www.imm.uran.ru/PERSONS/BIOGRAPH/PUB/KRASOVSK.HTM
- Short biography (in Russian): http://www.eunnet.net/USUbio/?base=mag&id=0128
