= Juncheng Wei =

Chinese mathematician

Juncheng Wei FRSC (Chinese: 魏军城; born 1968) is a Chinese mathematician working in the area of nonlinear partial differential equations, nonlinear analysis and mathematical biology. Since 1994, he has over 500 published articles in top journals, including Annals of Mathematics, Inventiones Mathematicae, Communications on Pure and Applied Mathematics, Duke Mathematical Journal, and SIAM Review.

Juncheng Wei lived in Hong Kong with his wife and two children, Andrew and Sophia, until August 2013.

He is now a professor of mathematics and a Canada Research Chair (Tier I) at the University of British Columbia. He received a Silver Morningside Medal in 2010, and was an invited speaker at the 2014 International Congress of Mathematicians. In 2019, Juncheng Wei was elected a Fellow of the Royal Society of Canada FRSC. In 2020, he was awarded the CMS Jeffery–Williams Prize and Simons Fellow in Mathematics.
