= Journal of Differential Equations =

Scientific journal

- Discipline: Mathematics
- Language: English
- Edited by: Adrian Constantin, Kening Lu, Juncheng Wei

Publication details
- History: 1965—present
- Publisher: Elsevier
- Frequency: Semi-monthly
- Impact factor: 2.3 (2025)

Standard abbreviations
- ISO 4: J. Differ. Equ.

Indexing
- ISSN: 0893-9659 (print); 1873-5452 (web)

Links
- Journal homepage; Online access; Online archive

Journal of Differential Equations is a peer-reviewed scientific journal published semi-monthly by Elsevier. Established in 1965, it focuses on the theory and the application of differential equations. Its current editors-in-chief are Adrian Constantin (University of Vienna), Kening Lu (Sichuan University) and Juncheng Wei (Chinese University of Hong Kong).

== Abstracting and indexing ==
The journal is abstracted and indexed in:

- Current Contents/Physical, Chemical & Earth Sciences
- EBSCO databases
- Ei Compendex
- Inspec
- MathSciNet
- Science Citation Index Expanded
- Scopus
- zbMATH

According to the Journal Citation Reports, the journal has a 2025 impact factor of 2.3.
