= Delay differential equation =

Type of differential equation

In mathematics, delay differential equations (DDEs) are a type of differential equation in which the derivative of the unknown function at a certain time is given in terms of the values of the function at previous times. DDEs are also called time-delay systems, systems with aftereffect or dead-time, hereditary systems, equations with deviating argument, or differential-difference equations. They belong to the class of systems with a functional state, i.e. partial differential equations (PDEs) which are infinite dimensional, as opposed to ordinary differential equations (ODEs) having a finite dimensional state vector. Four points may give a possible explanation of the popularity of DDEs:

1. Aftereffect is an applied problem: it is well known that, together with the increasing expectations of dynamic performances, engineers need their models to behave more like the real process. Many processes include aftereffect phenomena in their inner dynamics. In addition, actuators, sensors, and communication networks that are now involved in feedback control loops introduce such delays. Finally, besides actual delays, time lags are frequently used to simplify very high order models. Then, the interest for DDEs keeps on growing in all scientific areas and, especially, in control engineering.
2. Delay systems are still resistant to many classical controllers: one could think that the simplest approach would consist in replacing them by some finite-dimensional approximations. Unfortunately, ignoring effects which are adequately represented by DDEs is not a general alternative: in the best situation (constant and known delays), it leads to the same degree of complexity in the control design. In worst cases (time-varying delays, for instance), it is potentially disastrous in terms of stability and oscillations.
3. Voluntary introduction of delays can benefit the control system.
4. In spite of their complexity, DDEs often appear as simple infinite-dimensional models in the very complex area of partial differential equations (PDEs).

A general form of the time-delay differential equation for $x(t)\in \R^n$ is
$$\frac{d}{dt}x(t)=f(t,x(t),x_t),$$
where $x_t=\{x(\tau):\tau\leq t\}$ represents the trajectory of the solution in the past. In this equation, $f$ is a functional operator from $\R \times \R^n\times C^1(\R, \R^n)$ to $\R^n.$

== Examples ==
- Continuous delay
  $$\frac{d}{dt}x(t) = f{\left(t,x(t),\int_{-\infty}^0x(t+\tau)\, d\mu(\tau)\right)}$$
- Discrete delay
  $$\frac{d}{dt}x(t) = f(t,x(t),x(t-\tau_1),\dots,x(t-\tau_m))$$
  for $\tau_1 > \dots > \tau_m\geq 0.$
- Linear with discrete delays
  $$\frac{d}{dt}x(t) = A_0x(t)+A_1x(t-\tau_1) + \dots + A_mx(t-\tau_m)$$
  where $A_0,\dotsc,A_m\in \R^{n\times n}$.
- Pantograph equation
  $$\frac{d}{dt}x(t) = ax(t) + bx(\lambda t),$$
  where a, b and λ are constants and 0 < λ < 1. This equation and some more general forms are named after the pantographs on trains.

== Solving DDEs ==
DDEs are mostly solved in a stepwise fashion with a principle called the method of steps. For instance, consider the DDE with a single delay
$$\frac{d}{dt}x(t)=f(x(t),x(t-\tau))$$

with given initial condition $\phi\colon [-\tau,0]\to \R^n$. Then the solution on the interval $[0,\tau]$ is given by $\psi(t)$ which is the solution to the inhomogeneous initial value problem
$$\frac{d}{dt}\psi(t)=f(\psi(t),\phi(t-\tau)),$$
with $\psi(0)=\phi(0)$. This can be continued for the successive intervals by using the solution to the previous interval as inhomogeneous term. In practice, the initial value problem is often solved numerically.

=== Example ===
Suppose $f(x(t),x(t-\tau))=ax(t-\tau)$ and $\phi(t)=1$. Then the initial value problem can be solved with integration,

$$x(t)=x(0)+ \int_{s=0}^t \frac{d}{dt}x(s) \,ds =1+a\int_{s=0}^t \phi(s-\tau)\,ds,$$

i.e., $x(t)=at+1$, where the initial condition is given by $x(0)=\phi(0)=1$. Similarly, for the interval $t\in[\tau,2\tau]$ we integrate and fit the initial condition,

$$\begin{align}
x(t) = x(\tau) + \int_{s=\tau}^t \frac{d}{dt}x(s) \,ds
&= (a\tau+1) + a\int_{s=\tau}^t \left(a(s-\tau)+1 \right) ds \\
&= (a\tau+1)+a\int_{s=0}^{t-\tau} \left(as+1\right) ds,
\end{align}$$

i.e., $x(t)=(a\tau+1)+a(t-\tau)\left(\frac{1}{2}{a(t-\tau)} + 1\right).$

== Reduction to ODE ==
In some cases, differential equations can be represented in a format that looks like delay differential equations.

- Example 1 Consider an equation
  $$\frac{d}{dt}x(t)=f\left(t,x(t),\int_{-\infty}^0x(t+\tau)e^{\lambda\tau}\,d\tau\right).$$
  Introduce $y(t)=\int_{-\infty}^0 x(t+\tau)e^{\lambda\tau}\,d\tau$ to get a system of ODEs
  $$\frac{d}{dt}x(t)=f(t,x,y),\quad \frac{d}{dt}y(t)=x-\lambda y.$$
- Example 2 An equation
  $$\frac{d}{dt}x(t)=f\left(t,x(t),\int_{-\infty}^0 x(t+\tau)\cos(\alpha\tau+\beta)\,d\tau\right)$$
  is equivalent to
  $$\frac{d}{dt}x(t)=f(t,x,y),\quad \frac{d}{dt}y(t)=\cos(\beta)x+\alpha z,\quad \frac{d}{dt}z(t)=\sin(\beta) x-\alpha y,$$
  where
  $$y=\int_{-\infty}^0x(t+\tau)\cos(\alpha\tau+\beta)\, d\tau,\quad z=\int_{-\infty}^0x(t+\tau)\sin(\alpha\tau+\beta)\,d\tau.$$

== The characteristic equation ==
Similar to ODEs, many properties of linear DDEs can be characterized and analyzed using the characteristic equation. The characteristic equation associated with the linear DDE with discrete delays
$$\frac{d}{dt}x(t) = A_0x(t) + A_1x(t-\tau_1) + \dots + A_mx(t-\tau_m)$$
is the exponential polynomial given by
$$\det(-\lambda I+A_0+A_1e^{-\tau_1\lambda}+\dotsb+A_me^{-\tau_m\lambda})=0.$$

The roots λ of the characteristic equation are called characteristic roots or eigenvalues and the solution set is often referred to as the spectrum. Because of the exponential in the characteristic equation, the DDE has, unlike the ODE case, an infinite number of eigenvalues, making a spectral analysis more involved. The spectrum does however have some properties which can be exploited in the analysis. For instance, even though there are an infinite number of eigenvalues, there are only a finite number of eigenvalues in any vertical strip of the complex plane.

This characteristic equation is a nonlinear eigenproblem and there are many methods to compute the spectrum numerically. In some special situations it is possible to solve the characteristic equation explicitly. Consider, for example, the following DDE:
$$\frac{d}{dt}x(t)=-x(t-1).$$
The characteristic equation is
$$-\lambda-e^{-\lambda}=0.$$
There are an infinite number of solutions to this equation for complex λ. They are given by
$$\lambda=W_k(-1),$$
where W_{k} is the kth branch of the Lambert W function, so:
$$x(t)=x(0)\, e^{W_k(-1)\cdot t}.$$

== Another example ==
The following DDE:
$$\frac{d}{dt}u(t)=2u(2t+1)-2u(2t-1)$$
has as solution in $\mathbb{R}$ the function:
$$u(t)=\begin{cases} F(t+1), & |t|<1 \\ 0, & |t|\geq 1 \end{cases}$$
with $F$ the Fabius function, also known as Rvachëv up function.

This equation could also be used to show that uniqueness of solutions is not granted, as example consider the solution:

$$w(t)=\int_0^t \int_0^y u(x)dxdy$$

By construction, you could see that it solves the differential equation:

$$\frac{d}{dt}w(t)=\frac{1}{2}\left(w(2t+1)-w(2t-1)\right)$$

But also, you could find that it is solved by the alternative solution:

$$w_2(t)=ct$$

for any constant $c$.

== Applications ==
- Dynamics of diabetes
- Epidemiology
- Population dynamics
- Classical electrodynamics

== See also ==
- Functional differential equation
- Halanay Inequality
- Anger function
