= Comparison theorem =

In mathematics, comparison theorems are theorems whose statement involves comparisons between various mathematical objects of the same type, and often occur in fields such as calculus, differential equations and Riemannian geometry.

== Differential equations ==
In the theory of differential equations, comparison theorems assert particular properties of solutions of a differential equation (or of a system thereof), provided that an auxiliary equation/inequality (or a system thereof) possesses a certain property. Differential (or integral) inequalities, derived from differential (respectively, integral) equations by replacing the equality sign with an inequality sign, form a broad class of such auxiliary relations.

One instance of such theorem was used by Aronson and Weinberger to characterize solutions of Fisher's equation, a reaction-diffusion equation. Other examples of comparison theorems include:

- Chaplygin's theorem
- Grönwall's inequality, and its various generalizations, provides a comparison principle for the solutions of first-order ordinary differential equations
- Lyapunov comparison theorem
- Sturm comparison theorem
- Hille-Wintner comparison theorem

== Riemannian geometry ==
In Riemannian geometry, it is a traditional name for a number of theorems that compare various metrics and provide various estimates in Riemannian geometry.

- Rauch comparison theorem relates the sectional curvature of a Riemannian manifold to the rate at which its geodesics spread apart
- Toponogov's theorem
- Myers's theorem
- Hessian comparison theorem
- Laplacian comparison theorem
- Morse–Schoenberg comparison theorem
- Berger comparison theorem, Rauch–Berger comparison theorem
- Berger–Kazdan comparison theorem
- Warner comparison theorem for lengths of N-Jacobi fields (N being a submanifold of a complete Riemannian manifold)
- Bishop–Gromov inequality, conditional on a lower bound for the Ricci curvatures
- Lichnerowicz comparison theorem
- Eigenvalue comparison theorem
  - Cheng's eigenvalue comparison theorem
- Comparison triangle

== Between algebraic and analytic geometry ==
There exist various comparisons between algebraic geometry and analytic geometry often known as GAGA theorems due to the abbreviation of Serre's foundational article Géométrie Algébrique et Géométrie Analytique.

- Algebraic and analytic geometry over the complex numbers (GAGA)
- Artin comparison theorem - identifies the Étale cohomology of finite type schemes and the cohomology of their analytic counterparts.

== See also ==
- Limit comparison theorem, about convergence of series
- Comparison theorem for integrals, about convergence of integrals
- Zeeman's comparison theorem, a technical tool from the theory of spectral sequences
