= Research Institute for Advanced Studies =

Organization for scientific research in the US

Coordinates: 39.322397°N 76.60274°W

- Merged into: Martin Marietta Corporation
- Formation: 1955
- Dissolved: 1973
- Purpose: Research
- Headquarters: Baltimore, Maryland
- Location: 7212 Bellona Avenue, Baltimore, Maryland 21212, USA
- Fields: Applied mathematics, Control theory, Systems theory
- Owner: Glenn L. Martin Company
- Key people: George Bunker
- Staff: Solomon Lefschetz, Rudolf E. Kálmán, Joseph P. LaSalle, Jack K. Hale, Harold J. Kushner, Walter Murray Wonham and others.

The Baltimore-based Research Institute for Advanced Studies (RIAS) was among the several centers for research in the mathematical and physical sciences established throughout the United States after World War II.

== History ==
In recognition of the critical role that fundamental scientific research played in the outcome of that war. Although not as well known as other similar institutes, such as the IAS mentioned above, or the RAND Corporation, it nevertheless made significant contributions to the sciences of systems and control theory, and various branches of mathematics, during its 18-year existence.

The Research Institute for Advanced Studies (sometimes referred to in the singular) was founded in 1955 by George Bunker of the Glenn L. Martin Company, the ancestor of the aerospace giant Lockheed Martin. Its founding was the idea of George Bunker, who took over from Glenn Martin as chairman of that company in 1952. Bunker established the Institute in Baltimore, Maryland, specifically chartered to support fundamental research. The RIAS's first Director was Welcome W. Bender.

The RIAS changed its name to Martin Marietta Laboratories and turned its mission away from basic research in 1973, after the merger that produced the Martin Marietta Corporation.
