= List of differential geometry topics =

This is a list of differential geometry topics. See also glossary of differential and metric geometry and list of Lie group topics.

== Differential geometry of curves and surfaces ==
=== Differential geometry of curves ===
- List of curves topics
- Frenet–Serret formulas
- Curves in differential geometry
- Line element
- Curvature
- Radius of curvature
- Osculating circle
- Curve
- Fenchel's theorem

=== Differential geometry of surfaces ===
- Theorema egregium
- Gauss–Bonnet theorem
- First fundamental form
- Second fundamental form
- Gauss–Codazzi–Mainardi equations
- Dupin indicatrix
- Asymptotic curve
- Curvature
  - Principal curvatures
  - Mean curvature
  - Gauss curvature
  - Elliptic point
- Types of surfaces
  - Minimal surface
  - Ruled surface
  - Conical surface
  - Developable surface
  - Nadirashvili surface

== Foundations ==
=== Calculus on manifolds ===
See also multivariable calculus, list of multivariable calculus topics

- Manifold
  - Differentiable manifold
  - Smooth manifold
  - Banach manifold
  - Fréchet manifold
- Tensor analysis
  - Tangent vector
  - Tangent space
  - Tangent bundle
  - Cotangent space
  - Cotangent bundle
  - Tensor
  - Tensor bundle
  - Vector field
  - Tensor field
  - Differential form
  - Exterior derivative
  - Lie derivative
  - pullback (differential geometry)
  - pushforward (differential)
- jet (mathematics)
  - Contact (mathematics)
  - jet bundle
- Frobenius theorem (differential topology)
- Integral curve

=== Differential topology ===
- Diffeomorphism
  - Large diffeomorphism
- Orientability
- characteristic class
  - Chern class
  - Pontrjagin class
  - spin structure
- differentiable map
  - submersion
  - immersion
  - Embedding
    - Whitney embedding theorem
- Critical value
  - Sard's theorem
  - Saddle point
  - Morse theory
- Lie derivative
- Hairy ball theorem
- Poincaré–Hopf theorem
- Stokes' theorem
- De Rham cohomology
- Sphere eversion
- Frobenius theorem (differential topology)
  - Distribution (differential geometry)
  - integral curve
  - foliation
  - integrability conditions for differential systems

=== Fiber bundles ===
- Fiber bundle
- Principal bundle
  - Frame bundle
  - Hopf bundle
- Associated bundle
- Vector bundle
  - Tangent bundle
  - Cotangent bundle
  - Line bundle
- Jet bundle

=== Fundamental structures ===
- Sheaf (mathematics)
- Pseudogroup
- G-structure
- synthetic differential geometry

== Riemannian geometry ==
=== Fundamental notions ===
- Metric tensor
- Riemannian manifold
  - Pseudo-Riemannian manifold
- Levi-Civita connection

=== Non-Euclidean geometry ===
- Non-Euclidean geometry
- Elliptic geometry
  - Spherical geometry
  - Sphere-world
  - Angle excess
- hyperbolic geometry
  - hyperbolic space
  - hyperboloid model
  - Poincaré disc model
  - Poincaré half-plane model
  - Poincaré metric
  - Angle of parallelism

=== Geodesic ===
- Prime geodesic
- Geodesic flow
- Exponential map (Lie theory)
- Exponential map (Riemannian geometry)
- Injectivity radius
- Geodesic deviation equation
  - Jacobi field

=== Symmetric spaces (and related topics) ===
- Riemannian symmetric space
  - Margulis lemma
- Space form
  - Constant curvature
  - taut submanifold
- Uniformization theorem
  - Myers theorem
  - Gromov's compactness theorem

=== Riemannian submanifolds ===
- Gauss–Codazzi equations
- Darboux frame
- Hypersurface
- Induced metric
- Nash embedding theorem
- minimal surface
  - Helicoid
  - Catenoid
  - Costa's minimal surface
- Hsiang–Lawson's conjecture

=== Curvature of Riemannian manifolds ===
- Theorema Egregium
- Gauss–Bonnet theorem
  - Chern–Gauss–Bonnet theorem
  - Chern–Weil homomorphism
- Gauss map
- Second fundamental form
- Curvature form
- Riemann curvature tensor
- Geodesic curvature
- Scalar curvature
- Sectional curvature
- Ricci curvature, Ricci flat
- Ricci decomposition
  - Schouten tensor
  - Weyl curvature
- Ricci flow
- Einstein manifold
- Holonomy

=== Theorems in Riemannian geometry ===
- Gauss–Bonnet theorem
- Hopf–Rinow theorem
- Cartan–Hadamard theorem
- Myers theorem
- Rauch comparison theorem
- Morse index theorem
- Synge theorem
- Weinstein theorem
- Toponogov theorem
- Sphere theorem
- Hodge theory
- Uniformization theorem
- Yamabe problem

=== Isometry ===
- Killing vector field
- Myers-Steenrod theorem

=== Laplace–Beltrami operator ===
- Hodge star operator
- Weitzenböck identity
- Laplacian operators in differential geometry

=== Formulas and other tools ===
- List of coordinate charts
- List of formulas in Riemannian geometry
- Christoffel symbols

=== Related structures ===
- Intrinsic metric
- Pseudo-Riemannian manifold
- Sub-Riemannian manifold
- Finsler geometry
- General relativity
- G2 manifold
- Information geometry
  - Fisher information metric

== Connections ==
- covariant derivative
  - exterior covariant derivative
- Levi-Civita connection
- parallel transport
  - Development (differential geometry)
- connection form
- Cartan connection
  - affine connection
  - conformal connection
  - projective connection
  - method of moving frames
  - Cartan's equivalence method
  - Vierbein, tetrad
  - Cartan connection applications
  - Einstein–Cartan theory
- connection (vector bundle)
- connection (principal bundle)
- Ehresmann connection
- curvature
  - curvature form
  - holonomy, local holonomy
  - Chern–Weil homomorphism
  - Curvature vector
  - Curvature form
  - Curvature tensor
  - Cocurvature
- torsion (differential geometry)

== Complex manifolds ==
- Riemann surface
- Complex projective space
- Kähler manifold
- Dolbeault operator
- CR manifold
- Stein manifold
- Almost complex structure
- Hermitian manifold
- Newlander–Nirenberg theorem
- Generalized complex manifold
- Calabi–Yau manifold
- Hyperkähler manifold
- K3 surface
- hypercomplex manifold
- Quaternion-Kähler manifold

== Symplectic geometry ==
- Symplectic topology
- Symplectic space
- Symplectic manifold
- Symplectic structure
- Symplectomorphism
- Contact structure
- Contact geometry
- Hamiltonian system
- Sasakian manifold
- Poisson manifold

== Conformal geometry ==
- Möbius transformation
- Conformal map
- conformal connection
- tractor bundle
- Weyl curvature
- Weyl–Schouten theorem
- ambient construction
- Willmore energy
- Willmore flow

== Index theory ==
- Atiyah–Singer index theorem
- de Rham cohomology
- Dolbeault cohomology
- elliptic complex
- Hodge theory
- pseudodifferential operator

== Homogeneous spaces ==
- Klein geometry, Erlangen programme
- symmetric space
- space form
- Maurer–Cartan form
- Examples
  - hyperbolic space
  - Gauss–Bolyai–Lobachevsky space
  - Grassmannian
  - Complex projective space
  - Real projective space
  - Euclidean space
  - Stiefel manifold
  - Upper half-plane
  - Sphere

== Systolic geometry ==
- Loewner's torus inequality
- Pu's inequality
- Gromov's inequality for complex projective space
- Wirtinger inequality (2-forms)
- Gromov's systolic inequality for essential manifolds
- Essential manifold
- Filling radius
- Filling area conjecture
- Bolza surface
- First Hurwitz triplet
- Hermite constant
- Systoles of surfaces
- Systolic freedom
- Systolic category

== Other ==
- Envelope (mathematics)
- Bäcklund transform
