= Entropy (disambiguation) =

Entropy is a fundamental scientific concept that quantifies the statistical probability of a system's state. It is a universal measure of multiplicity.

Entropy may also refer to:

== Science and technology ==
=== Physics ===
- Entropy (classical thermodynamics), thermodynamic entropy in macroscopic terms, with less emphasis on the statistical explanation
- Entropy (statistical thermodynamics), the statistical explanation of thermodynamic entropy based on probability theory
  - Configuration entropy, the entropy change due to a change in the knowledge of the position of particles, rather than their momentum
  - Conformational entropy, the entropy change due to a change in the "configuration" of a particle (e.g. a right-handed vs. a left-handed polyatomic molecule)
- Tsallis entropy, a generalization of Boltzmann-Gibbs entropy
- von Neumann entropy, entropy in quantum statistical physics and quantum information science
- Entropy (order and disorder), the relationship of disorder with heat and work
- Entropy in thermodynamics and information theory, the relationship between thermodynamic entropy and information (Shannon) entropy
- Entropy (energy dispersal), dispersal of energy as a descriptor of entropy
- Entropy (astrophysics), the adiabatic constant

=== Information theory and mathematics ===
- Entropy (information theory), also called Shannon entropy, a measure of the unpredictability or information content of a message source
- Differential entropy, a generalization of entropy in information theory to continuous random variables
  - Entropy of entanglement, related to the Shannon and von Neumann entropies for entangled systems; reflecting the degree of entanglement of subsystems
- Algorithmic entropy, an (incomputable) measure of the information content of a particular message
- Rényi entropy, a family of diversity measures generalising Shannon entropy; used to define fractal dimensions
- Topological entropy, a measure of exponential growth in dynamical systems; equivalent to the rate of increase of α->0 Renyi entropy of a trajectory in trajectory-space
- Volume entropy, a Riemannian invariant measuring the exponential rate of volume growth of a Riemannian metric
- Graph entropy, a measure of the information rate achievable by communicating symbols over a channel in which certain pairs of values may be confused

=== Other uses in science and technology ===
- Entropy encoding, data compression strategies to produce a code length equal to the entropy of a message
- Entropy (computing), an indicator of the number of random bits available to seed cryptography systems
- Entropy (anesthesiology), a measure of a patient's cortical function, based on the mathematical entropy of EEG signals
- Entropy (ecology), measures of biodiversity in the study of biological ecology, based on Shannon and Rényi entropies
- Social entropy, a measure of the natural decay within a social system

== Arts and entertainment ==
=== Film and television ===
- Entropy (film), 1999, by Phil Joanou
- "Entropy" (Buffy episode), 2002
- "Entropy", an episode of Criminal Minds season 11

=== Games ===
- Entropy (board game)
- Entropy (video game)
- Entropy or Alchemiss, a character in Freedom Force vs the 3rd Reich
- N. Tropy, a character from Crash Bandicoot: Warped
- Entropy: Zero, a Source mod for Half-Life 2 released in 2017 developed by Breadman
- Entropy: Zero 2, a sequel to Entropy: Zero released in 2022

=== Literature ===
- Entropy: A New World View, a book by Jeremy Rifkin and Ted Howard
- "Entropy", a 1960 short story by Thomas Pynchon
- "Entropy", a 1995 short story by Leanne Frahm
- Entropy (journal), a scientific journal published by MDPI
- Entropy (magazine), an online literary magazine

=== Music ===
- Entropy / Send Them, an EP by DJ Shadow and the Groove Robbers
- "Entropy", a song by Bad Religion from Against the Grain
- "Entropy", a song by Kelly Osbourne from Sleeping in the Nothing
- "Entropy", a song by VNV Nation from Matter + Form
- "Entropy", a song by Moxy Früvous from The 'b' Album
- "Entropy", a song by Brymo from Oṣó
- "Entropy", a song by Daniel Caesar from Case Study 01
- "Entropy", a song by Beach Bunny from Emotional Creature
- "Entropy", a song by MC Hawking
- "Entropy", a song by Grimes and Bleachers
- Entropia (album), by Pain of Salvation
- Entropy, a track by Nigel Stanford
- The Book Of Us: Entropy, an album by DAY6
- Entropy (album), by King Gizzard & the Lizard Wizard, 2026

=== Other uses in arts and entertainment ===
- Entropy (choreography), the difference between a transcription and a performance

== Other uses ==
- Entropy (package manager), a Sabayon Linux utility
- Exluna Entropy, computer graphics rendering software
- Information entropy, relating to disruptive actions taken in Internet vigilantism
