= Systole (disambiguation) =

Systole may refer to:

- Systole (medicine), a term describing the contraction of the heart
- Systolic array, a term used in computer architecture
- Systolic geometry, a term used in mathematics
  - In mathematics, Systoles of surfaces are systolic inequalities for curves on surfaces
  - Also see Introduction to systolic geometry
