= Holmes–Thompson volume =

Concept in normed space geometry

In geometry of normed spaces, the Holmes–Thompson volume is a notion of volume that allows to compare sets contained in different normed spaces (of the same dimension). It was introduced by Raymond D. Holmes and Anthony Charles Thompson.

== Definition ==
The Holmes–Thompson volume $\operatorname{Vol}_\text{HT}(A)$ of a measurable set $A\subseteq R^n$ in a normed space $(\mathbb{R}^n,\|-\|)$ is defined as the 2n-dimensional measure of the product set $A\times B^*,$ where $B^* \subseteq \mathbb{R}^n$ is the dual unit ball of $\|-\|$ (the unit ball of the dual norm $\|-\|^*$).

== Symplectic (coordinate-free) definition ==
The Holmes–Thompson volume can be defined without coordinates: if $A\subseteq V$ is a measurable set in an n-dimensional real normed space $(V,\|-\|),$ then its Holmes–Thompson volume is defined as the absolute value of the integral of the volume form $\frac 1{n!}\overbrace{\omega\wedge\cdots\wedge\omega}^n$ over the set $A\times B^*$,

$$\operatorname{Vol}_{HT}(A)=\left|\int_{A\times B^*}\frac1{n!}\omega^n\right|$$

where $\omega$ is the standard symplectic form on the vector space $V\times V^*$ and $B^*\subseteq V^*$ is the dual unit ball of $\|-\|$.

This definition is consistent with the previous one, because if each point $x\in V$ is given linear coordinates $(x_i)_{0\leq i<n}$ and each covector $\xi \in V^*$ is given the dual coordinates $(xi_i)_{0\leq i<n}$ (so that $\xi(x)=\sum_i \xi_i x_i$), then the standard symplectic form is $\omega=\sum_i \mathrm d x_i \wedge \mathrm d \xi_i$, and the volume form is

$$\frac 1{n!} \omega^n = \pm\; \mathrm d x_0 \wedge \dots \wedge \mathrm d x_{n-1} \wedge \mathrm d \xi_0 \wedge \dots \wedge \mathrm d \xi_{n-1},$$

whose integral over the set $A\times B^* \subseteq V\times V^* \cong \mathbb R^n \times \mathbb R^n$ is just the usual volume of the set in the coordinate space $\mathbb R ^{2n}$.

== Volume in Finsler manifolds ==
More generally, the Holmes–Thompson volume of a measurable set $A$ in a Finsler manifold $(M,F)$ can be defined as

$$\operatorname{Vol}_\text{HT}(A):=\int_{B^*A} \frac 1{n!} \omega ^n,$$

where $B^*A=\{(x,\xi)\in \mathrm T^*M:\ x\in A\text{ and }\xi\in \mathrm T^*_xM\text{ with }\|\xi\|_x^*\leq 1\}$ and $\omega$ is the standard symplectic form on the cotangent bundle $\mathrm T^*M$. Holmes–Thompson's definition of volume is appropriate for establishing links between the total volume of a manifold and the length of the geodesics (shortest curves) contained in it (such as systolic inequalities and filling volumes) because, according to Liouville's theorem, the geodesic flow preserves the symplectic volume of sets in the cotangent bundle.

=== Computation using coordinates ===
If $M$ is a region in coordinate space $\mathbb R^n$, then the tangent and cotangent spaces at each point $x\in M$ can both be identified with $\mathbb R^n$. The Finsler metric is a continuous function $F:TM=M\times\mathbb R^n \to [0,+\infty)$ that yields a (possibly asymmetric) norm $F_x:v \in \mathbb R^n\mapsto \|v\|_x=F(x,v)$ for each point $x\in M$. The Holmes–Thompson volume of a subset A ⊆ M can be computed as

$$\operatorname{Vol}_{\textrm{HT}}(A) = |B^*A| = \int_A |B^*_x| \,\mathrm d\operatorname{Vol_n}(x)$$

where for each point $x\in M$, the set $B^*_x \subseteq \mathbb R^n$ is the dual unit ball of $F_x$ (the unit ball of the dual norm $F_x^* = \|-\|_x^*$), the bars $|-|$ denote the usual volume of a subset in coordinate space, and $\mathrm d\operatorname{Vol_n}(x)$ is the product of all n coordinate differentials $\mathrm dx_i$.

This formula follows, again, from the fact that the 2n-form $\textstyle{ \frac 1{n!} \omega ^n }$ is equal (up to a sign) to the product of the differentials of all $n$ coordinates $\mathrm x_i$ and their dual coordinates $\xi_i$. The Holmes–Thompson volume of A is then equal to the usual volume of the subset $B^*A = \{(x,\xi)\in M\times \mathbb R^n : \xi\in B^*_x \}$ of $\mathbb R^{2n}$.

== Santaló's formula ==
If $A$ is a simple region in a Finsler manifold (that is, a region homeomorphic to a ball, with convex boundary and a unique geodesic along $A$ joining each pair of points of $A$), then its Holmes–Thompson volume can be computed in terms of the path-length distance (along $A$) between the boundary points of $A$ using Santaló's formula, which in turn is based on the fact that the geodesic flow on the cotangent bundle is Hamiltonian.

== Normalization and comparison with Euclidean and Hausdorff measure ==
The original authors used a different normalization for Holmes–Thompson volume. They divided the value given here by the volume of the Euclidean n-ball, to make Holmes–Thompson volume coincide with the product measure in the standard Euclidean space $(\mathbb{R}^n,\|-\|_2)$. This article does not follow that convention.

If the Holmes–Thompson volume in normed spaces (or Finsler manifolds) is normalized, then it never exceeds the Hausdorff measure. This is a consequence of the Blaschke-Santaló inequality. The equality holds if and only if the space is Euclidean (or a Riemannian manifold).
