= Firey =

Firey may refer to:

- Lewis P. Firey (1825–1885), American politician
- William J. Firey (1923–2004), American mathematician
- Firey, a character from Battle for Dream Island, an animated web series
- Fireys from Jim Henson's Labyrinth
- Firey Hill, a summit in the Central New York Region
