= Steve Shnider =

Steve Shnider (Hebrew: סטיב שניידר) is a retired professor of mathematics at Bar Ilan University. He received a PhD in Mathematics from Harvard University in 1972, under Shlomo Sternberg. His main interests are in the differential geometry of fiber bundles; algebraic methods in the theory of deformation of geometric structures; symplectic geometry; supersymmetry; operads; and Hopf algebras. He retired in 2014.

== Book on operads ==
A 2002 book of Markl, Shnider and Stasheff Operads in algebra, topology, and physics was the first book to provide a systematic treatment of operad theory, an area of mathematics that came to prominence in 1990s and found many applications in algebraic topology, category theory, graph cohomology, representation theory, algebraic geometry, combinatorics, knot theory, moduli spaces, and other areas. The book was the subject of a Featured Review in Mathematical Reviews by Alexander A. Voronov which stated, in particular: "The first book whose main goal is the theory of operads per se ... a book such as this one has been long awaited by a wide scientific readership, including mathematicians and theoretical physicists ... a great piece of mathematical literature and will be helpful to anyone who needs to use operads, from graduate students to mature mathematicians and physicists."

== Bibliography ==
=== Books ===
- Markl, Martin; Shnider, Steven; Stasheff, James D (2002), Operads in algebra, topology, and physics, Mathematical surveys and monographs, v. 96, American Mathematical Society, ISBN 978-0-8218-2134-3, OCLC 318373640
- Shnider, Steven; Sternberg, Shlomo (1993), Quantum groups : from coalgebras to Drinfeld algebras : a guided tour, Graduate texts in mathematical physics, 2., International Press, cop, ISBN 978-1-57146-000-4, OCLC 438550743
- Shnider, Steven; Wells, Raymond O (1989), Supermanifolds, super twistor spaces and super Yang-Mills fields, Séminaire de Mathematiques Supérieures, Séminaire Scientifique OTAN (Nato advanced study institute), Département de Mathématiques et de Statistique, Université de Montréal, 106, Montréal (Québec) Presses de l'Univ. de Montréal, ISBN 978-2-7606-0286-1, OCLC 230986063

=== Selected papers ===
- Katz, Mikhail G.; Schaps, David; Shnider, Steve (2013), "Almost Equal: The Method of Adequality from Diophantus to Fermat and Beyond", Perspectives on Science, 21 (3): 283–324, arXiv:1210.7750, Bibcode:2012arXiv1210.7750K, doi:10.1162/POSC_a_00101, S2CID 57569974.
- Bangert, Victor; Katz, Mikhail G; Shnider, Steven; Weinberger, Shmuel (2009), "E_{7}, Wirtinger inequalities, Cayley 4-form, and homotopy", Duke Mathematical Journal, 146 (1), Duke University Press: 35–70, arXiv:math.DG/0608006, doi:10.1215/00127094-2008-061, OCLC 298960889, S2CID 2575584
