= Systolic freedom =

In differential geometry, systolic freedom refers to the fact that closed Riemannian manifolds may have arbitrarily small volume regardless of their systolic invariants. That is, systolic invariants or products of systolic invariants do not in general provide universal (i.e. curvature-free) lower bounds for the total volume of a closed Riemannian manifold.

Systolic freedom was first detected by Mikhail Gromov in an I.H.É.S. preprint in 1992 (which eventually appeared as Gromov 1996), and was further developed by Mikhail Katz, Michael Freedman and others. Gromov's observation was elaborated on by Marcel Berger (1993). One of the first publications to study systolic freedom in detail is by Katz (1995).

Systolic freedom has applications in quantum error correction. Croke & Katz (2003) survey the main results on systolic freedom.

== Example ==
The complex projective plane admits Riemannian metrics of arbitrarily small volume, such that every essential surface is of area at least 1. Here a surface is called "essential" if it cannot be contracted to a point in the ambient 4-manifold.

== Systolic constraint ==
The opposite of systolic freedom is systolic constraint, characterized by the presence of systolic inequalities such as Gromov's systolic inequality for essential manifolds.
