= Shmuel Weinberger =

American topologist

Shmuel Aaron Weinberger (born February 20, 1963) is an American topologist. He enrolled in a specially designed concurrent BA-PhD program at New York University, obtaining a BA in 1981 and a PhD in mathematics in 1982 under the direction of Sylvain Cappell. Weinberger was, from 1994 to 1996, the Thomas A. Scott Professor of Mathematics at the University of Pennsylvania, and he is currently the Andrew MacLeish Professor of Mathematics and chair of the Mathematics department at the University of Chicago.

His research interests include geometric topology, differential geometry, geometric group theory, and, in recent years, applications of topology in other disciplines. He has written a book on topologically stratified spaces and a book on the application of mathematical logic to geometry.

He has given the Porter lectures at Rice University (2000), the Jankowski memorial lecture of the Polish Academy of Sciences (2000), the Zabrodsky Memorial lecture at Hebrew University (2001), the Cairns lectures at University of Illinois at Urbana-Champaign (2002), the Marker lectures in Mathematics at Penn State University (2003), the Lewis Lectures at Rutgers University (2004), the Blumenthal Lectures at Tel Aviv University (2005), the Hardy Lectures of the London Mathematical Society (2008), the William Benter Lecture at the City University of Hong Kong (2010), the Clifford Lectures at Tulane University (2012), the Minerva Lectures at Princeton University (2017) and the Abraham Robinson lecture at Yale (2019). In addition he has given invited lectures at the International Congress of Mathematicians in Zürich (1994), a mini-symposium at the European Congress of Mathematics (2008), the American Mathematical Society (1989), the Canadian Mathematical Society (2006), the Association for Symbolic Logic (2001), and Pembroke Pines Charter High School (2021).

In 2012, he was elected to the first class of AMS fellows. In 2013, he was elected as a fellow of AAAS.

== Selected publications ==
Books

- Weinberger, Shmuel (1994). The topological classification of stratified spaces. Chicago Lectures in Mathematics. University of Chicago Press, Chicago, IL.
- Weinberger, Shmuel (2005). Computers, rigidity, and moduli. The large-scale fractal geometry of Riemannian moduli space. M. B. Porter Lectures. Princeton University Press, Princeton, NJ. doi:10.2307/j.ctv17db3tj. S2CID 240987281.

Research articles

- Attie, Oliver; Block, Jonathan; Weinberger, Shmuel (1992). "Characteristic classes and distortion of diffeomorphisms". Journal of the American Mathematical Society. 5 (4): 919–921. doi:10.1090/S0894-0347-1992-1145336-8.
- Bangert, Victor; Katz, Mikhail; Shnider, Steve; Weinberger, Shmuel (2009). "$E_7$, Wirtinger inequalities, Cayley 4-form, and homotopy". Duke Mathematical Journal. 146 (1): 35–70. arXiv:math.DG/0608006. doi:10.1215/00127094-2008-061. S2CID 2575584.
- Block, Jonathan; Weinberger, Shmuel (1992). "Aperiodic tilings, positive scalar curvature and amenability of spaces". Journal of the American Mathematical Society. 5 (4): 907–918. doi:10.1090/S0894-0347-1992-1145337-X.
- Bryant, John Logan; Ferry, Steven C.; Mio, Washington; Weinberger, Shmuel (1996). "Topology of homology manifolds". Annals of Mathematics. 143 (3): 435–467. arXiv:math/9304210. doi:10.2307/2118532. JSTOR 2118532.
- Davis, James F.; Weinberger, Shmuel (1986). "Group actions on homology spheres". Inventiones Mathematicae. 86 (2): 209–231. Bibcode:1986InMat..86..209D. doi:10.1007/BF01389069.
- Dranishnikov, Alexander N.; Ferry, Steven C.; Weinberger, Shmuel (2003). "Large Riemannian manifolds which are flexible". Annals of Mathematics. 157 (3): 919–938. doi:10.4007/annals.2003.157.919.
- Farber, Michael; Weinberger, Shmuel (2001). "On the zero-in-the-spectrum conjecture". Annals of Mathematics. 154 (1): 139–154. arXiv:math/9911077. doi:10.2307/3062113. JSTOR 3062113. S2CID 16442504.
- Ferry, Steven C.; Weinberger, Shmuel (1991). "Curvature, tangentiality, and controlled topology". Inventiones Mathematicae. 105 (2): 401–414. Bibcode:1991InMat.105..401F. doi:10.1007/BF01232272.
- Manevitz, Larry M.; Weinberger, Shmuel (1996). "Discrete circle actions: a note using non-standard analysis". Israel Journal of Mathematics. 94: 147–155. doi:10.1007/BF02762701.
- Farb, Benson; Weinberger, Shmuel (2008). "Isometries, rigidity and universal covers". Annals of Mathematics. 168 (3): 915–940. arXiv:math/0506544. doi:10.4007/annals.2008.168.915.
- Niyogi, Partha; Smale, Stephen; Weinberger, Shmuel (2008). "Finding the homology of submanifolds with high confidence from random samples". Discrete & Computational Geometry. 39 (1–3): 419–441. doi:10.1007/s00454-008-9053-2.
- Niyogi, Partha; Smale, Stephen; Weinberger, Shmuel (2011). "A topological view of unsupervised learning from noisy data". SIAM Journal on Computing. 40 (3): 646–663. doi:10.1137/090762932.
- Weinberger, Shmuel (2004). "On the topological social choice model". Journal of Economic Theory. 115 (2): 377–384. doi:10.1016/S0022-0531(03)00257-6.
- Chambers, Gregory R.; Dotterrer, Dominic; Manin, Fedor; Weinberger, Shmuel (2018). "Quantitative nullcobordism". Journal of the American Mathematical Society. 31 (4): 1165–1203. arXiv:1610.04888. doi:10.1090/jams/903. S2CID 54040187.
