= Radius =

Line segment in a circle or sphere from its center to its perimeter or surface

Circle with: Radius R Circumference C Diameter D Center or origin O

In classical geometry, a radius (pl.: radii or radiuses) (Note: The plural of radius can be either radii (from the Latin plural) or the conventional English plural radiuses.) of a circle or sphere is any of the line segments from its center to its perimeter (circle) or surface (sphere), and, in more modern usage, it is also their length. The radius of a regular polygon is the line segment or distance from its center to any of its vertices. The name comes from the Latin radius, meaning ray but also the spoke of a chariot wheel. The typical abbreviation and mathematical symbol for radius is R or r. By extension, the diameter (denoted D or d) is defined as twice the radius:

$$d = 2r \quad \Rightarrow \quad r = \frac{1}{2}d$$

If an object does not have a center, the term may refer to its circumradius, the radius of its circumscribed circle or circumscribed sphere. In either case, the radius may be more than half the diameter, which is usually defined as the maximum distance between any two points of the figure. The inradius of a geometric figure is usually the radius of the largest circle or sphere contained in it. The inner radius of a ring, tube or other hollow object is the radius of its cavity.

For regular polygons, the radius is the same as its circumradius. The inradius of a regular polygon is also called the apothem. In graph theory, the radius of a graph is the minimum over all vertices u of the maximum distance from u to any other vertex of the graph.

The radius of the circle with perimeter (circumference) C is (Note: Circle circumference divided by diameter: the result is a number designated by the greek letter pi: $\pi$)

$$r = \frac C {2\pi}$$

== Formula ==
For many geometric figures, the radius has a well-defined relationship with other measures of the figure.

=== Circles ===
The radius of a circle with area A is

$$r = \sqrt{\frac{A}{\pi}}$$

The radius of the circle that passes through the three non-collinear points P_{1}, P_{2}, and P_{3} is given by

$$r=\frac{ \Bigl|\vec{OP_1} - \vec{OP_3} \Bigr|}{2\sin\theta}$$

where θ is the angle ∠P_{1}P_{2}P_{3}. This formula uses the law of sines. If the three points are given by their coordinates (x_{1},y_{1}), (x_{2},y_{2}), and (x_{3},y_{3}), the radius can be expressed as

$$r = \frac { \sqrt{\bigl[(x_2 - x_1)^2 + (y_2 - y_1)^2\bigr] \bigl[(x_2 - x_3)^2 + (y_2 - y_3)^2\bigr] \bigl[(x_3 - x_1)^2 + (y_3 - y_1)^2 \bigr]} }
{ 2\bigl| x_1  y_2 + x_2 y_3 + x_3 y_1 - x_1 y_3 - x_2 y_1 - x_3 y_2\bigr| }$$

=== Regular polygons ===
n	R_{n}
3	0.577350...
4	0.707106...
5	0.850650...
6	1
7	1.152382...
8	1.306562...
9	1.461902...
10	1.618033...

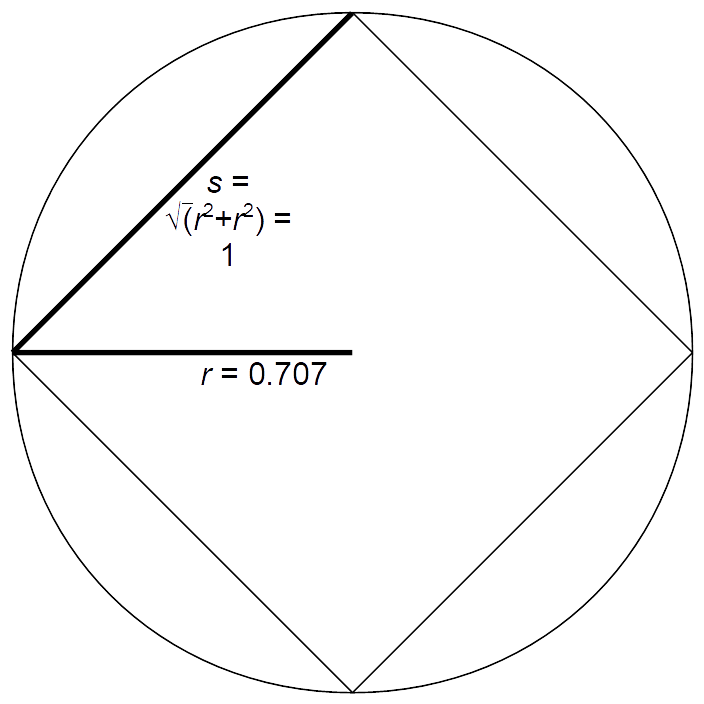
A square, for example (n = 4)

The radius r of a regular polygon with n sides of length s is given by r = R_{n} s, where

$$R_n = \frac{1}{2 \sin \tfrac{\pi}{n} }.$$

Values of R_{n} for small values of n are given in the table. If s = 1 then these values are also the radii of the corresponding regular polygons.

=== Hypercubes ===
The radius of a d-dimensional hypercube with side s is

$$r = \frac{s}{2}\sqrt{d}$$

== Use in coordinate systems ==
=== Polar coordinates ===
The polar coordinate system is a two-dimensional coordinate system in which each point on a plane is determined by a distance from a fixed point and an angle from a fixed direction.

The fixed point (analogous to the origin of a Cartesian system) is called the pole, and the ray from the pole in the fixed direction is the polar axis. The distance from the pole is called the radial coordinate or radius, and the angle is the angular coordinate, polar angle, or azimuth.

=== Cylindrical coordinates ===
In the cylindrical coordinate system, there is a chosen reference axis and a chosen reference plane perpendicular to that axis. The origin of the system is the point where all three coordinates can be given as zero. This is the intersection between the reference plane and the axis.

The axis is variously called the cylindrical or longitudinal axis, to differentiate it from the polar axis, which is the ray that lies in the reference plane, starting at the origin and pointing in the reference direction.

The distance from the axis may be called the radial distance or radius, while the angular coordinate is sometimes referred to as the angular position or as the azimuth. The radius and the azimuth are together called the polar coordinates, as they correspond to a two-dimensional polar coordinate system in the plane through the point, parallel to the reference plane. The third coordinate may be called the height or altitude (if the reference plane is considered horizontal), longitudinal position, or axial position.

=== Spherical coordinates ===
In a spherical coordinate system, the radius describes the distance of a point from a fixed origin. Its position if further defined by the polar angle measured between the radial direction and a fixed zenith direction, and the azimuth angle, the angle between the orthogonal projection of the radial direction on a reference plane that passes through the origin and is orthogonal to the zenith, and a fixed reference direction in that plane.

== See also ==
- Bend radius
- Filling radius in Riemannian geometry
- Mean radius
- Radius of convergence
- Radius of convexity
- Radius of curvature
- Radius of gyration
- Semidiameter
