= Filling radius =

In Riemannian geometry, the filling radius of a Riemannian manifold X is a metric invariant of X. It was originally introduced in 1983 by Mikhail Gromov, who used it to prove his systolic inequality for essential manifolds, vastly generalizing Loewner's torus inequality and Pu's inequality for the real projective plane, and creating systolic geometry in its modern form.

The filling radius of a simple loop C in the plane is defined as the largest radius, R > 0, of a circle that fits inside C:

$$\mathrm{FillRad}(C\subset \mathbb{R}^2) = R.$$

== Dual definition via neighborhoods ==
There is a kind of a dual point of view that allows one to generalize this notion in an extremely fruitful way, as shown by Gromov. Namely, we consider the $\varepsilon$-neighborhoods of the loop C, denoted

$$U_\varepsilon C \subset \mathbb{R}^2.$$

As $\varepsilon>0$ increases, the $\varepsilon$-neighborhood $U_\varepsilon C$ swallows up more and more of the interior of the loop. The last point to be swallowed up is precisely the center of a largest inscribed circle. Therefore, we can reformulate the above definition by defining $\mathrm{FillRad}(C\subset \mathbb{R}^2)$ to be the infimum of $\varepsilon > 0$ such that the loop C contracts to a point in $U_\varepsilon C$.

Given a compact manifold X imbedded in, say, Euclidean space E, we could define the filling radius relative to the imbedding, by minimizing the size of the neighborhood $U_\varepsilon X\subset E$ in which X could be homotoped to something smaller dimensional, e.g., to a lower-dimensional polyhedron. Technically it is more convenient to work with a homological definition.

== Homological definition ==
Denote by A the coefficient ring $\mathbb{Z}$ or $\mathbb{Z}_2$, depending on whether or not X is orientable. Then the fundamental class, denoted [X], of a compact n-dimensional manifold X, is a generator of the homology group $H_n(X;A)\simeq A$, and we set

$$\mathrm{FillRad}(X\subset E) = \inf \left\{ \varepsilon > 0 \mid \iota_\varepsilon([X])=0\in H_n(U_\varepsilon X) \right\},$$

where $\iota_\varepsilon$ is the inclusion homomorphism.

To define an absolute filling radius in a situation where X is equipped with a Riemannian metric g, Gromov proceeds as follows. One exploits Kuratowski embedding. One imbeds X in the Banach space $L^\infty(X)$ of bounded Borel functions on X, equipped with the sup norm $\|\cdot\|$. Namely, we map a point $x\in X$ to the function $f_x\in L^\infty(X)$ defined by the formula $f_x(y) = d(x,y)$ for all $y\in X$, where d is the distance function defined by the metric. By the triangle inequality we have $d(x,y) = \| f_x - f_y \|,$ and therefore the imbedding is strongly isometric, in the precise sense that internal distance and ambient distance coincide. Such a strongly isometric imbedding is impossible if the ambient space is a Hilbert space, even when X is the Riemannian circle (the distance between opposite points must be π, not 2!). We then set $E= L^\infty(X)$ in the formula above, and define

$$\mathrm{FillRad}(X)=\mathrm{FillRad} \left( X\subset
L^{\infty}(X) \right).$$

== Properties ==
- The filling radius is at most a third of the diameter (Katz, 1983).
- The filling radius of real projective space with a metric of constant curvature is a third of its Riemannian diameter, see (Katz, 1983). Equivalently, the filling radius is a sixth of the systole in these cases.
- The filling radius of the Riemannian circle of length 2π, i.e. the unit circle with the induced Riemannian distance function, equals π/3, i.e. a sixth of its length. This follows by combining the diameter upper bound mentioned above with Gromov's lower bound in terms of the systole (Gromov, 1983)
- The systole of an essential manifold M is at most six times its filling radius, see (Gromov, 1983).
  - The inequality is optimal in the sense that the boundary case of equality is attained by the real projective spaces as above.
- The injectivity radius of compact manifold gives a lower bound on filling radius. Namely,
  $$\mathrm{FillRad} M\ge \frac{\mathrm{InjRad} M}{2(\dim M+2)}.$$

== See also ==
- Filling area conjecture
- Gromov's systolic inequality for essential manifolds
