= Gromov's systolic inequality for essential manifolds =

Inequality in Riemannian geometry

In the mathematical field of Riemannian geometry, M. Gromov's systolic inequality bounds the length of the shortest non-contractible loop on a Riemannian manifold in terms of the volume of the manifold. Gromov's systolic inequality was proved in 1983; it can be viewed as a generalisation, albeit non-optimal, of Loewner's torus inequality and Pu's inequality for the real projective plane.

Technically, let M be an essential Riemannian manifold of dimension n; denote by sysπ_{1}(M) the homotopy 1-systole of M, that is, the least length of a non-contractible loop on M. Then Gromov's inequality takes the form

$$\left(\operatorname{sys\pi}_1(M)\right)^n \leq C_n \operatorname{vol}(M),$$

where C_{n} is a universal constant only depending on the dimension of M.

== Essential manifolds ==
A closed manifold is called essential if its fundamental class defines a nonzero element in the homology of its fundamental group, or more precisely in the homology of the corresponding Eilenberg–MacLane space. Here the fundamental class is taken in homology with integer coefficients if the manifold is orientable, and in coefficients modulo 2, otherwise.

Examples of essential manifolds include aspherical manifolds, real projective spaces, and lens spaces.

== Proofs of Gromov's inequality ==
Gromov's original 1983 proof is about 35 pages long. It relies on a number of techniques and inequalities of global Riemannian geometry. The starting point of the proof is the imbedding of X into the Banach space of Borel functions on X, equipped with the sup norm. The imbedding is defined by mapping a point p of X, to the real function on X given by the distance from the point p. The proof utilizes the coarea inequality, the isoperimetric inequality, the cone inequality, and the deformation theorem of Herbert Federer.

== Filling invariants and recent work ==
One of the key ideas of the proof is the introduction of filling invariants, namely the filling radius and the filling volume of X. Namely, Gromov proved a sharp inequality relating the systole and the filling radius,

$$\mathrm{sys\pi}_1 \leq 6\; \mathrm{FillRad}(X),$$

valid for all essential manifolds X; as well as an inequality

$$\mathrm{FillRad}(X) \leq C_n \mathrm{vol}_n{}^{\tfrac{1}{n}}(X),$$

valid for all closed manifolds X.

It was shown by Brunnbauer (2008) that the filling invariants, unlike the systolic invariants, are independent of the topology of the manifold in a suitable sense.

Guth (2011) and Ambrosio & Katz (2011) developed approaches to the proof of Gromov's systolic inequality for essential manifolds.

== Inequalities for surfaces and polyhedra ==
Stronger results are available for surfaces, where the asymptotics when the genus tends to infinity are by now well understood, see systoles of surfaces. A uniform inequality for arbitrary 2-complexes with non-free fundamental groups is available, whose proof relies on the Grushko decomposition theorem.

== See also ==
- Filling area conjecture
- Gromov's inequality (disambiguation)
- Gromov's inequality for complex projective space
- Loewner's torus inequality
- Pu's inequality
- Systolic geometry
