= Santaló's formula =

In differential geometry, Santaló's formula describes how to integrate a function on the unit sphere bundle of a Riemannian manifold by first integrating along every geodesic separately and then over the space of all geodesics. It is a standard tool in integral geometry and has applications in isoperimetric and rigidity results. The formula is named after Luis Santaló, who first proved the result in 1952.

== Formulation ==
Let $(M,\partial M,g)$ be a compact, oriented Riemannian manifold with boundary. Suppose that every vector in the unit tangent bundle $SM$ can be reached via the geodesic flow starting from points on $\partial M$. Then for a function $f: SM \rightarrow \mathbb{C}$, Santaló's formula takes the form

$$\int_{SM} f(x,v) \, d\mu(x,v) = \int_{\partial_+ SM} \left[ \int_0^{\tau(x,v)} f(\varphi_t(x,v)) \, dt \right] \langle v, \nu(x) \rangle \, d \sigma(x,v),$$

where

- $(\varphi_t)_t$ is the geodesic flow and $\tau(x,v) = \sup\{t\ge 0: \forall s\in [0,t]:~ \varphi_s(x,v)\in SM \}$ is the exit time of the geodesic with initial conditions $(x,v)\in SM$,
- $\mu$ and $\sigma$ are the Riemannian volume forms with respect to the Sasaki metric on $SM$ and $\partial S M$ respectively ($\mu$ is also called Liouville measure),
- $\nu$ is the inward-pointing unit normal to $\partial M$ and $\partial_+ SM := \{(x,v) \in SM: x \in \partial M, \langle v,\nu(x) \rangle \ge 0 \}$ the influx-boundary, which should be thought of as parametrization of the space of geodesics.

== Validity ==
Under the assumptions that

1. $M$ is non-trapping (i.e. $\tau(x,v) <\infty$ for all $(x,v)\in SM$) and
2. $\partial M$ is strictly convex (i.e. the second fundamental form $II_{\partial M}(x)$ is positive definite for every $x \in \partial M$),

Santaló's formula is valid for all $f\in C^\infty(M)$. In this case it is equivalent to the following identity of measures:

$$\Phi^*d \mu (x,v,t) = \langle \nu(x),x\rangle d \sigma(x,v) d t,$$

where $\Omega=\{(x,v,t): (x,v)\in \partial_+SM, t\in (0,\tau(x,v)) \}$ and $\Phi:\Omega \rightarrow SM$ is defined by $\Phi(x,v,t)=\varphi_t(x,v)$. In particular this implies that the geodesic X-ray transform $I f(x,v) = \int_0^{\tau(x,v)} f(\varphi_t(x,v)) \, dt$ extends to a bounded linear map $I: L^1(SM, \mu) \rightarrow L^1(\partial_+ SM, \sigma_\nu)$, where $d\sigma_\nu(x,v) = \langle v, \nu(x) \rangle \, d \sigma(x,v)$ and thus there is the following, $L^1$-version of Santaló's formula:

$$\int_{SM} f \, d \mu = \int_{\partial_+ SM} If ~ d \sigma_\nu \quad \text{for all } f \in L^1(SM,\mu).$$

If the non-trapping or the convexity condition from above fail, then there is a set $E\subset SM$ of positive measure, such that the geodesics emerging from $E$ either fail to hit the boundary of $M$ or hit it non-transversely. In this case Santaló's formula only remains true for functions with support disjoint from this exceptional set $E$.

== Proof ==
The following proof is taken from [ Lemma 3.3], adapted to the (simpler) setting when conditions 1) and 2) from above are true. Santaló's formula follows from the following two ingredients, noting that $\partial_0SM=\{(x,v):\langle \nu(x), v\rangle =0 \}$ has measure zero.

- An integration by parts formula for the geodesic vector field $X$:

$$\int_{SM} Xu ~ d \mu = - \int_{\partial_+ SM} u ~ d \sigma_\nu \quad \text{for all } u \in C^\infty(SM)$$

- The construction of a resolvent for the transport equation $X u = - f$:

$$\exists R: C_c^\infty( SM\smallsetminus\partial_0 SM) \rightarrow C^\infty(SM): XRf = - f \text{ and } Rf\vert_{\partial_+ SM} = If \quad \text{for all } f\in C_c^\infty( SM\smallsetminus\partial_0 SM)$$

For the integration by parts formula, recall that $X$ leaves the Liouville-measure $\mu$ invariant and hence $Xu = \operatorname{div}_G (uX)$, the divergence with respect to the Sasaki-metric $G$. The result thus follows from the divergence theorem and the observation that $\langle X(x,v), N(x,v)\rangle_G = \langle v, \nu(x)\rangle_g$, where $N$ is the inward-pointing unit-normal to $\partial SM$. The resolvent is explicitly given by $Rf(x,v) = \int_0^{\tau(x,v)} f(\varphi_t(x,v)) \, dt$ and the mapping property $C_c^\infty( SM\smallsetminus\partial_0 SM) \rightarrow C^\infty(SM)$ follows from the smoothness of $\tau: SM\smallsetminus\partial_0 SM \rightarrow [0,\infty)$, which is a consequence of the non-trapping and the convexity assumption.
