= Operator monotone function =

In linear algebra, operator monotone functions are an important type of real-valued function, fully classified by Charles Löwner in 1934. They are closely related to operator concave and operator convex functions, and are encountered in operator theory and in matrix theory, and led to the Löwner–Heinz inequality. Operator monotone functions are called in other contexts complete Bernstein function, Nevanlinna function, Pick function or class (S) function.

== Definition ==
A function $f : I \to \Reals$ defined on an interval $I \subseteq \Reals$ is said to be operator monotone if whenever $A$ and $B$ are Hermitian matrices (of any size/dimensions) whose eigenvalues all belong to the domain of $f$ and whose difference $A - B$ is a positive semi-definite matrix, then necessarily $f(A) - f(B) \geq 0$ where $f(A)$ and $f(B)$ are the values of the matrix function induced by $f$ (which are matrices of the same size as $A$ and $B$). The function $f$ is said to be n-matrix monotone (or just n-monotone) if the above holds for any matrices $A$ and $B$ of size $n$ (but not necessarily of other sizes).

Notation

This definition is frequently expressed with the notation that is now defined.

Write $A \geq 0$ to indicate that a matrix $A$ is positive semi-definite and write $A \geq B$ to indicate that the difference $A - B$ of two matrices $A$ and $B$ satisfies $A - B \geq 0$ (that is, $A - B$ is positive semi-definite).

With $f : I \to \Reals$ and $A$ as in the theorem's statement, the value of the matrix function $f(A)$ is the matrix (of the same size as $A$) defined in terms of its $A$'s spectral decomposition $A = \sum_j \lambda_j P_j$ by
$$f(A) = \sum_j f(\lambda_j)P_j ~,$$
where the $\lambda_j$ are the eigenvalues of $A$ with corresponding projectors $P_j.$

The definition of an operator monotone function may now be restated as:

A function $f : I \to \Reals$ defined on an interval $I \subseteq \Reals$ said to be operator monotone if (and only if) for all positive integers $n,$ and all $n \times n$ Hermitian matrices $A$ and $B$ with eigenvalues in $I,$ if $A \geq B$ then $f(A) \geq f(B).$

== Löwner’s theorem on holomorphic extension ==
Löwner’s theorem states that a function $f$ is operator monotone if and only if it allows an analytic continuation to the upper half-plane with non-negative imaginary part.

More generally, a function $f(z) \geq 0$ for $z \geq 0$ is operator monotone if and only if it extends to a holomorphic function on $\C \setminus (-\infty, 0]$ such that

$$\begin{align} \operatorname{Im} f(z) & \ge 0 \qquad && \text{if } \operatorname{Im} z \ge 0 , \\
\operatorname{Im} f(z) & \le 0 \qquad && \text{if } \operatorname{Im} z \le 0 . \end{align}$$

which can be summarized as $\operatorname{Im} f(z) \operatorname{Im} z \ge 0$.

== Relation to Bernstein functions ==
Operator monotone functions are a special type of Bernstein function. If we write the Bernstein representation of the Bernstein function $f$ as
$$f(t) = a + bt + \int_0^\infty \left(1 - e^{-tx}\right) \mu(dx),$$
then $f$ is operator monotone if and only if the measure $\mu$ has a density function and this function is completely monotone, which explains why such a function $f$ is also called a complete Bernstein function.

== See also ==
- Matrix function – Function that maps matrices to matrices
- Trace inequality – Concept in Hlibert spaces mathematics
