= Bonnesen's inequality =

Geometric inequality

Bonnesen's inequality is an inequality relating the length, the area, the radius of the incircle and the radius of the circumcircle of a Jordan curve. It is a strengthening of the classical isoperimetric inequality.

More precisely, consider a planar simple closed curve of length $L$ bounding a domain of area $A$. Let $r$ and $R$ denote the radii of the incircle and the circumcircle. Bonnesen proved the inequality
$$\pi^2 (R-r)^2 \leq L^2-4\pi A.$$

The term $L^2-4\pi A$ in the right hand side is known as the isoperimetric defect.

Loewner's torus inequality with isosystolic defect is a systolic analogue of Bonnesen's inequality.
