= Charles Loewner =

American mathematician (1893–1968)

- Born: 29 May 1893; Lány, Bohemia
- Died: 8 January 1968 (aged 74); Stanford, California, U.S.
- Citizenship: American
- Education: University of Prague
- Known for: Operator monotone function Systolic geometry Loewner equation Loewner order Loewner's torus inequality Loewner–Heinz theorem
- Scientific career
- Fields: Mathematics
- Workplaces: Stanford University; Syracuse University; University of Prague
- Doctoral advisor: Georg Alexander Pick
- Doctoral students: Lipman Bers; William J. Firey; Adriano Garsia; Roger Horn; Pao Ming Pu

Charles Loewner (29 May 1893 – 8 January 1968) was an American mathematician. His name was Karel Löwner in Czech and Karl Löwner in German.

== Early life and career ==
Karl Loewner was born into a Jewish family in Lány, about 30 km from Prague, where his father Sigmund Löwner was a store owner.

Loewner received his Ph.D. from the University of Prague in 1917 under supervision of Georg Pick. One of his central mathematical contributions is the proof of the Bieberbach conjecture in the first highly nontrivial case of the third coefficient. The technique he introduced, the Loewner differential equation, has had far-reaching implications in geometric function theory; it was used in the ultimate solution of the Bieberbach conjecture by Louis de Branges in 1985.

Loewner taught mathematics at the University of Berlin and University of Prague before leaving for the United States. "Richard von Mises wrote from Istanbul, in a 1939 letter of recommendation for Löwner: 'During his activity at the University of Berlin, [Lõwner] was, among all the instructors in Mathematics, the one who had the strongest influence upon the students, stimulated them to independent research, and helped them in his unselfish way. Much of the work involved in the published theses of his pupils is not only due to his influence, but can in a true sense be considered as his work'."

After the Nazis occupied Prague, where he was living, he escaped with his family to the United States.

In the United States he taught at University of Louisville, Brown University, Syracuse University and eventually at Stanford University. His students include Lipman Bers, Roger Horn, Adriano Garsia, and P. M. Pu.

== Loewner's torus inequality ==
In 1949 Loewner proved his torus inequality, which states that for every metric on the 2-torus, its systol sys satisfies the optimal inequality

$$\operatorname{sys}^2 \leq \frac{2}{\sqrt{3}} \operatorname{area} (\mathbb T^2).$$

The boundary case of equality is attained if and only if the metric is flat and homothetic to the so-called equilateral torus, the torus whose group of deck transformations is precisely the hexagonal lattice spanned by the cube roots of unity in $\mathbb C$.

== Loewner matrix theorem ==
The Loewner matrix (in linear algebra) is a square matrix or, more specifically, a linear operator (of real $C^1$ functions) associated with two input parameters consisting of (1) a real continuously differentiable function on a subinterval of the real numbers and (2) an $n$-dimensional vector with elements chosen from the subinterval; the two input parameters are assigned an output parameter consisting of an $n \times n$ matrix.

Let $f$ be a real-valued function that is continuously differentiable on the open interval $(a,b)$.

For any $s, t \in (a, b)$ define the divided difference of $f$ at $s, t$ as

$$f^{[1]}(s,t) =
\begin{cases} \displaystyle
\frac{f(s)-f(t)}{s-t}, & \text{if } s \neq t \\
f'(s), & \text{if } s = t
\end{cases}$$.

Given $t_1, \ldots, t_n \in (a,b)$, the Loewner matrix $L_f (t_1, \ldots, t_n)$ associated with $f$ for $(t_1,\ldots,t_n)$ is defined as the $n \times n$ matrix whose $(i,j)$-entry is $f^{[1]}(t_i,t_j)$.

In his fundamental 1934 paper, Loewner proved that for each positive integer $n$, $f$ is $n$-monotone on $(a,b)$ if and only if $L_f (t_1, \ldots, t_n)$ is positive semidefinite for any choice of $t_1,\ldots,t_n \in (a,b)$. Most significantly, using this equivalence, he proved that $f$ is $n$-monotone on $(a,b)$ for all $n$ if and only if $f$ is real analytic with an analytic continuation to the upper half plane that has a positive imaginary part on the upper plane. See Operator monotone function.

== Continuous groups ==
"During [Loewner's] 1955 visit to Berkeley he gave a course on continuous groups, and his lectures were reproduced in the form of duplicated notes. Loewner planned to write a detailed book on continuous groups based on these lecture notes, but the project was still in the formative stage at the time of his death." Harley Flanders and Murray H. Protter "decided to revise and correct the original lecture notes and make them available in permanent form." Charles Loewner: Theory of Continuous Groups (1971) was published by The MIT Press, and re-issued in 2008.

In Loewner's terminology, if $x\in S$ and a group action is performed on $S$, then $x$ is called a quantity (page 10). The distinction is made between an abstract group $\mathfrak{g},$ and a realization of $\mathfrak{g},$ in terms of linear transformations that yield a group representation. These linear transformations are Jacobians denoted $J(\overset{u}{v})$ (page 41). The term invariant density is used for the Haar measure, which Loewner attributes to Adolph Hurwitz (page 46). Loewner proves that compact groups have equal left and right invariant densities (page 48).

== Works ==
- Löwner, C. (1917), "Untersuchungen über die Verzerrung bei konformen Abbildungen des Einheitskreises |z| < 1, die durch Funktionen mit nicht verschwindender Ableitung geliefert werden", Ber. Verh. Sachs. Ges. Wiss. Leipzig, 69: 89–106
- Löwner, C. (1923), "Untersuchungen über schlichte konforme Abbildungen des Einheitskreises. I", Math. Ann., 89 (1–2): 103–121, doi:10.1007/BF01448091, hdl:10338.dmlcz/125927, JFM 49.0714.01
- Löwner, Karl (1934). "Über monotone Matrixfunktionen". Mathematische Zeitschrift. 38 (1): 177–216. doi:10.1007/BF01170633. S2CID 121439134.
- 1950: "Some classes of functions defined by difference or differential inequalities", Bulletin of the American Mathematical Society 56(4): 308–19 doi:10.1090/S0002-9904-1950-09405-1
- 1971: (with Murray H. Protter and Harley Flanders) Charles Loewner: Theory of Continuous Groups, MIT Press ISBN 0-262-06-041-8, re-issued in 2008 by Dover Books with revised title Theory of Continuous Groups ISBN 978-0486462929
- 1974: (with Louis Nirenberg) "Partial differential equations invariant under conformal or projective transformations", in Contributions to Analysis (a collection of papers dedicated to Lipman Bers), pp. 245–272. Academic Press

== See also ==
- Löwner-John ellipsoid
- Schramm–Loewner evolution
- Loop-erased random walk
- Systoles of surfaces
