= List of coordinate charts =

This article contains a non-exhaustive list of coordinate charts for Riemannian manifolds and pseudo-Riemannian manifolds. Coordinate charts are mathematical objects of topological manifolds, and they have multiple applications in theoretical and applied mathematics. When a differentiable structure and a metric are defined, greater structure exists, and this allows the definition of constructs such as integration and geodesics.

== Charts for Riemannian and pseudo-Riemannian surfaces ==
The following charts (with appropriate metric tensors) can be used in the stated classes of Riemannian and pseudo-Riemannian surfaces:

Surface Class	Surface	Charts
n-spheres	n-sphere S^{n}	Hopf chart Hyperspherical coordinates
n-spheres	Sphere S^{2}	Spherical coordinates Stereographic chart Central projection chart Axial projection chart Mercator chart
n-spheres	3-sphere S^{3}	Polar chart Stereographic chart Mercator chart
Euclidean spaces	n-dimensional Euclidean space E^{n}	Cartesian chart
Euclidean spaces	Euclidean plane E^{2}	Bipolar coordinates Biangular coordinates Two-center bipolar coordinates
Euclidean spaces	Euclidean space E^{3}	Polar spherical chart Cylindrical chart: Elliptical cylindrical, hyperbolic cylindrical, parabolic cylindrical charts; Parabolic chart Hyperbolic chart Prolate spheroidal chart (rational and trigonometric forms) Oblate spheroidal chart (rational and trigonometric forms) Toroidal chart
Hyperbolic spaces	n-dimensional hyperbolic space H^{n}	Upper half-space chart (Poincaré model) Hopf chart Central projection chart (Klein model)
Hyperbolic spaces	Hyperbolic plane H^{2}	Polar chart Stereographic chart (Poincaré model)
Embedded surfaces	Embedded in E^{3}	Monge chart
Minimal surfaces	Minimal surfaces	Asymptotic chart
Lorentzian manifolds	De Sitter space dSn	Static chart
Lorentzian manifolds	Anti-de Sitter space AdS_{n}	Half-space chart

== See also ==
- Coordinate chart
- Coordinate system
- Metric tensor
- List of mathematics lists, particularly:
  - List of multivariable calculus topics
  - List of Fourier analysis topics
  - List of differential geometry topics
