= Luis Santaló =

Spanish mathematician

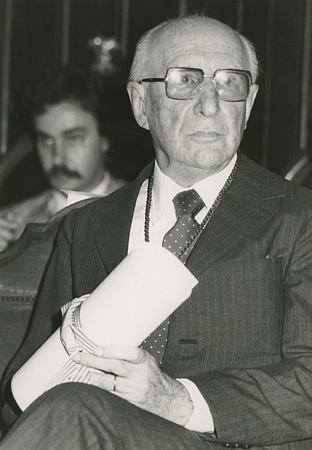
- Born: Luís Antoni Santaló Sors; October 9, 1911; Girona, Spain
- Died: November 22, 2001 (aged 90); Buenos Aires, Argentina
- Education: University of Hamburg
- Known for: Blaschke–Santaló inequality
- Scientific career
- Fields: Mathematics
- Workplaces: University of Buenos Aires
- Doctoral advisor: Wilhelm Blaschke; Pedro Pineda

Luís Antoni Santaló Sors (October 9, 1911 – November 22, 2001) was a Spanish mathematician.

He graduated from the University of Madrid and he studied at the University of Hamburg, where he received his Ph.D. in 1936. His advisor was Wilhelm Blaschke. Because of the Spanish Civil War, he moved to Argentina as a professor in the National University of the Littoral, National University of La Plata and University of Buenos Aires.

His work with Blaschke on convex sets is now cited in its connection with Mahler volume. Blaschke and Santaló also collaborated on integral geometry. Santaló wrote textbooks in Spanish on non-Euclidean geometry, projective geometry, and tensors.

== Works ==
Luis Santaló published in both English and Spanish:

=== Introduction to Integral Geometry (1953) ===
Chapter I. Metric integral geometry of the plane including densities and the isoperimetric inequality. Ch. II. Integral geometry on surfaces including Blaschke's formula and the isoperimetric inequality on surfaces of constant curvature. Ch. III. General integral geometry: Lie groups on the plane: central-affine, unimodular affine, projective groups.

=== Geometrias no Euclidianas (1961) ===
I. The Elements of Euclid II. Non-Euclidean geometries III., IV. Projective geometry and conics

V, VI, VII. Hyperbolic geometry: graphic properties, angles and distances, areas and curves. (This text develops the Klein model, the earliest instance of a model.)

VIII. Other models of non-Euclidean geometry

=== Geometria proyectiva (1966) ===
A curious feature of this book on projective geometry is the opening on abstract algebra including laws of composition, group theory, ring theory, fields, finite fields, vector spaces and linear mapping. These seven introductory sections on algebraic structures provide an enhanced vocabulary for the treatment of 15 classical topics of projective geometry. Furthermore, sections (14) projectivities with non-commutative fields, (22) quadrics over non-commutative fields, and (26) finite geometries embellish the classical study. The usual topics are covered such as (4) Fundamental theorem of projective geometry, (11) projective plane, (12) cross-ratio, (13) harmonic quadruples, (18) pole and polar, (21) Klein model of non-Euclidean geometry, (22–4) quadrics. Serious and coordinated study of this text is invited by 240 exercises at the end of 25 sections, with solutions on pages 347–65.

=== Integral Geometry and Geometric Probability (1976) ===
Amplifies and extends the 1953 text. For instance, in Chapter 19, he notes “Trends in Integral Geometry” and includes “The integral geometry of Gelfand” (p. 345) which involves inverting the Radon transform.

=== Vectores y tensores con sus aplicaciones (1977) ===
Includes standard vector algebra, vector analysis, introduction to tensor fields and Riemannian manifolds, geodesic curves, curvature tensor and general relativity to Schwarzschild metric. Exercises distributed at an average rate of ten per section enhance the 36 instructional sections. Solutions are found on pages 343–64.

== See also ==
- Santaló's formula
