= Pao Ming Pu =

Chinese mathematician (1910–1988)

Pao Ming Pu (Note: The form of his name he used in Western languages, although the Wade-Giles transliteration would be Pu Baoming.) (Chinese: 蒲保明 also named 蒲保民; pinyin: Pú Bǎomíng; August 1910 – February 22, 1988) was a Chinese mathematician born in Jintang County, Sichuan, China. He was a student of Charles Loewner and a pioneer of systolic geometry, having proved what is today called Pu's inequality for the real projective plane, following Loewner's proof of Loewner's torus inequality. He later worked in the area of fuzzy mathematics. He spent much of his career as professor and chairman of the department of mathematics at Sichuan University.

== Biography ==
Pu received his Ph.D. at Syracuse University in 1950 under the supervision of Charles Loewner, resulting in the publication in 1952 of the seminal paper containing both Pu's inequality for the real projective plane and Loewner's torus inequality. The listing at the Mathematics Genealogy Project indicates that his first name, according to Syracuse University records, was Frank.

Pu returned to mainland China in February 1951. (Katz '07) suggests that Pu may have been forced to return to the mainland by the communist authorities, as there was apparently a wave of recalls of Chinese academics working in the West following Chiang Kai-shek's ouster from the mainland in 1949.

After his return, Pu became a professor at Sichuan University in 1952. He served as head of the department of mathematics from 1952 to 1984. While he was apparently unable to supervise graduate students during most of his scientific career, he became one of the first group of supervisors for graduate students (bóshìshēng dǎoshī, 博士生导师) at the age of 71, four years after the end of the Cultural Revolution. Most of his later papers concern fuzzy topology.

== Influence ==
According to Google Scholar, Pu's seminal article from 1952 is cited by at least 93 mathematical works, a high score by mathematical standards. His joint work with Liu in fuzzy topology continues to be cited frequently in current literature in fuzzy mathematics.
