= Volume entropy =

The volume entropy is an asymptotic invariant of a compact Riemannian manifold that measures the exponential growth rate of the volume of metric balls in its universal cover. This concept is closely related with other notions of entropy found in dynamical systems and plays an important role in differential geometry and geometric group theory. If the manifold is nonpositively curved then its volume entropy coincides with the topological entropy of the geodesic flow. It is of considerable interest in differential geometry to find the Riemannian metric on a given smooth manifold which minimizes the volume entropy, with locally symmetric spaces forming a basic class of examples.

== Definition ==
Let (M, g) be a compact Riemannian manifold, with universal cover $\tilde{M}.$ Choose a point $\tilde{x}_0\in \tilde{M}$.

The volume entropy (or asymptotic volume growth) $h = h(M, g)$ is defined as the limit

$$h(M,g) = \lim_{R \to + \infty} \frac{\log \left( \operatorname{vol} B(R) \right)}{R},$$

where B(R) is the ball of radius R in $\tilde{M}$ centered at $\tilde{x}_0$ and vol is the Riemannian volume in the universal cover with the natural Riemannian metric.

A. Manning proved that the limit exists and does not depend on the choice of the base point. This asymptotic invariant describes the exponential growth rate of the volume of balls in the universal cover as a function of the radius.

== Properties ==
- Volume entropy h is always bounded above by the topological entropy h_{top} of the geodesic flow on M. Moreover, if M has nonpositive sectional curvature then h = h_{top}. These results are due to Manning.
- More generally, volume entropy equals topological entropy under a weaker assumption that M is a closed Riemannian manifold without conjugate points (Freire and Mañé).
- Locally symmetric spaces minimize entropy when the volume is prescribed. This is a corollary of a very general result due to Besson, Courtois, and Gallot (which also implies Mostow rigidity and its various generalizations due to Corlette, Siu, and Thurston):
  Let X and Y be compact oriented connected n-dimensional smooth manifolds and f: Y → X a continuous map of non-zero degree. If g_{0} is a negatively curved locally symmetric Riemannian metric on X and g is any Riemannian metric on Y then
  $$h^n(Y,g)\operatorname{vol}(Y,g) \geq \left|\deg(f)\right| h^n(X,g_0)\operatorname{vol}(X,g_0),$$
  and for n ≥ 3, the equality occurs if and only if (Y,g) is locally symmetric of the same type as (X,g_{0}) and f is homotopic to a homothetic covering (Y,g) → (X,g_{0}).

== Application in differential geometry of surfaces ==
Katok's entropy inequality was recently exploited to obtain a tight asymptotic bound for the systolic ratio of surfaces of large genus, see systoles of surfaces.
