= Girth (functional analysis) =

In functional analysis, the girth of a Banach space is the infimum of lengths of centrally symmetric simple closed curves in the unit sphere of the space. Equivalently, it is twice the infimum of distances between opposite points of the sphere, as measured within the sphere.

Every finite-dimensional Banach space has a pair of opposite points on the unit sphere that achieves the minimum distance, and a centrally symmetric simple closed curve that achieves the minimum length. However, such a curve may not always exist in infinite-dimensional spaces.

The girth is always at least four, because the shortest path on the unit sphere between two opposite points cannot be shorter than the length-two line segment connecting them through the origin of the space. A Banach space for which it is exactly four is said to be flat. There exist flat Banach spaces of infinite dimension in which the girth is achieved by a minimum-length curve; an example is the space C[0,1] of continuous functions from the unit interval to the real numbers, with the sup norm. The unit sphere of such a space has the counterintuitive property that certain pairs of opposite points have the same distance within the sphere that they do in the whole space.

The girth is a continuous function on the Banach–Mazur compactum, a space whose points correspond to the normed vector spaces of a given dimension. The girth of the dual space of a normed vector space is always equal to the girth of the original space.

== See also ==
- Systolic geometry
