= Gromov's inequality =

The following pages deal with inequalities due to Mikhail Gromov:

- Bishop–Gromov inequality
- Gromov's inequality for complex projective space
- Gromov's systolic inequality for essential manifolds
- Lévy–Gromov inequality
