= Systolic category =

The systole (or systolic category) is a numerical invariant of a closed manifold M, introduced by Mikhail Katz and Yuli Rudyak in 2006, by analogy with the Lusternik–Schnirelmann category. The invariant is defined in terms of the systoles of M and its covers, as the largest number of systoles in a product yielding a curvature-free lower bound for the total volume of M. The invariant is intimately related to the Lusternik-Schnirelmann category. Thus, in dimensions 2 and 3, the two invariants coincide. In dimension 4, the systolic category is known to be a lower bound for the Lusternik–Schnirelmann category.

== Bibliography ==
- Dranishnikov, Alexander N.; Rudyak, Yuli B. (2009). "Stable systolic category of manifolds and the cup-length". Journal of Fixed Point Theory and Applications. 6 (1): 165–177. arXiv:0812.4637. doi:10.1007/s11784-009-0118-5.
- Katz, Mikhail G.; Rudyak, Yuli B. (2008). "Bounding volume by systoles of 3-manifolds". Journal of the London Mathematical Society. 78 (2): 407–417. arXiv:math/0504008. doi:10.1112/jlms/jdm105.
- Dranishnikov, Alexander N.; Katz, Mikhail G.; Rudyak, Yuli B. (2011). "Cohomological dimension, self-linking, and systolic geometry". Israel Journal of Mathematics. 184 (1): 437–453. arXiv:0807.5040. doi:10.1007/s11856-011-0075-8.
- Brunnbauer, Michael (2008). "On manifolds satisfying stable systolic inequalities". Mathematische Annalen. 342 (4): 951–968. arXiv:0708.2589. doi:10.1007/s00208-008-0263-y.
- Katz, Mikhail G.; Rudyak, Yuli B. (2006). "Lusternik–Schnirelmann category and systolic category of low dimensional manifolds". Communications on Pure and Applied Mathematics. 59 (10): 1433–1456. arXiv:math/0410456. doi:10.1002/cpa.20146.
