= Sasaki metric =

Type of Riemannian metric

The Sasaki metric is a natural choice of Riemannian metric on the tangent bundle of a Riemannian manifold. Introduced by Shigeo Sasaki in 1958.

== Construction ==
Let $(M,g)$ be a Riemannian manifold, denote by $\tau\colon\mathrm{T} M\to M$ the tangent bundle over $M$. The Sasaki metric $\hat g$ on $\mathrm{T} M$ is uniquely defined by the following properties:

- The map $\tau\colon\mathrm{T} M\to M$ is a Riemannian submersion.
- The metric on each tangent space $\mathrm{T}_p\subset \mathrm{T} M$ is the Euclidean metric induced by $g$.
- Assume $\gamma(t)$ is a curve in $M$ and $v(t)\in\mathrm{T}_{\gamma(t)}$ is a parallel vector field along $\gamma$. Note that $v(t)$ forms a curve in $\mathrm{T} M$. For the Sasaki metric, we have $v'(t)\perp \mathrm{T}_{\gamma(t)}$for any $t$; that is, the curve $v(t)$ normally crosses the tangent spaces $\mathrm{T}_{\gamma(t)}\subset \mathrm{T} M$.
