= Taut submanifold =

In mathematics, a (compact) taut submanifold N of a space form M is a compact submanifold with the property that for every $q\in M$ the distance function

$$L_q:N\to\mathbf R,\qquad L_q(x) = \operatorname{dist}(x,q)^2$$

is a perfect Morse function.

If N is not compact, one needs to consider the restriction of the $L_q$ to any of their sublevel sets.
