= Entropy (astrophysics) =

In astrophysics, what is referred to as "entropy" is actually the adiabatic constant derived as follows.

Using the first law of thermodynamics for a quasi-static, infinitesimal process for a hydrostatic system

$dQ = dU-dW.$

For an ideal gas in this special case, the internal energy, U, is a function of only the temperature T; therefore the partial derivative of heat capacity with respect to T is identically the same as the full derivative, yielding through some manipulation

$$dQ = C_\text{v} dT+P\,dV.$$

Further manipulation using the differential version of the ideal gas law, the previous equation, and assuming constant pressure, one finds

$$dQ = C_\text{p} dT-V\,dP.$$

For an adiabatic process $dQ=0\,$ and recalling $\gamma = {C_\text{p}}/{C_\text{v}}\,$, one finds

$\frac{V\,dP = C_\text{p} dT}{P\,dV = -C_\text{v} dT}$
$\frac{dP}{P} = -\frac{dV}{V}\gamma.$

One can solve this simple differential equation to find

$$PV^{\gamma} = \text{constant} = K$$

This equation is known as an expression for the adiabatic constant, K, also called the adiabat. From the ideal gas equation one also knows

$$P=\frac{\rho k_\text{B}T}{\mu m_\text{H}},$$

where $k_\text{B}$ is the Boltzmann constant. Substituting this into the above equation along with $V=[\mathrm{g}]/\rho\,$ and $\gamma = 5/3\,$ for an ideal monatomic gas one finds

$$K = \frac{k_\text{B}T}{(\rho/\mu m_\text{H})^{2/3}},$$

where $\mu\,$ is the mean molecular weight of the gas or plasma; and $m_\text{H}$ is the mass of the hydrogen atom, which is extremely close to the mass of the proton, $m_{p}$, the quantity more often used in astrophysical theory of galaxy clusters. This is what astrophysicists refer to as "entropy" and has units of [keV⋅cm^{2}]. This quantity relates to the thermodynamic entropy as

$$\Delta S = 3/2 \ln K .$$
