= Entropy (choreography) =

In hermeneutics, Arianna Béatrice Fabbricatore has used the term entropy, relying on the works of Umberto Eco, to identify and assess the loss of meaning between the verbal description of dance and the choreotext (the moving silk engaged by the dancer in enacting the choreographic writing) generated by inter-semiotic translation operations.

This use is linked to the notions of logotext and choreotext. In the transition from logotext to choreotext it is possible to identify two typologies of entropy: the first, called "natural", is related to the uniqueness of the performative act and its ephemeral character. The second is caused by "voids" more or less important in the logotext (i.e. the verbal text that reflects the action danced).
