= Gromov's inequality for complex projective space =

Optimal stable 2-systolic inequality

In Riemannian geometry, Gromov's optimal stable 2-systolic inequality is the inequality

$$\mathrm{stsys}_2{}^n \leq n!
\;\mathrm{vol}_{2n}(\mathbb{CP}^n)$$,

valid for an arbitrary Riemannian metric on the complex projective space, where the optimal bound is attained by the symmetric Fubini–Study metric, providing a natural geometrisation of quantum mechanics. Here $\operatorname{stsys_2}$ is the stable 2-systole, which in this case can be defined as the infimum of the areas of rational 2-cycles representing the class of the complex projective line $\mathbb{CP}^1 \subset \mathbb{CP}^n$ in 2-dimensional homology.

The inequality first appeared in Gromov (1981) as Theorem 4.36.

The proof of Gromov's inequality relies on the Wirtinger inequality for exterior 2-forms.

== Projective planes over division algebras $\mathbb{R,C,H}$ ==
In the special case n=2, Gromov's inequality becomes $\mathrm{stsys}_2{}^2 \leq 2 \mathrm{vol}_4(\mathbb{CP}^2)$. This inequality can be thought of as an analog of Pu's inequality for the real projective plane $\mathbb{RP}^2$. In both cases, the boundary case of equality is attained by the symmetric metric of the projective plane. Meanwhile, in the quaternionic case, the symmetric metric on $\mathbb{HP}^2$ is not its systolically optimal metric. In other words, the manifold $\mathbb{HP}^2$ admits Riemannian metrics with higher systolic ratio $\mathrm{stsys}_4{}^2/\mathrm{vol}_8$ than for its symmetric metric (Bangert et al. 2009).

== See also ==
- Loewner's torus inequality
- Pu's inequality
- Gromov's inequality (disambiguation)
- Gromov's systolic inequality for essential manifolds
- Systolic geometry
