= Pu's inequality =

Inequality in differential geometry

An animation of the Roman surface representing RP^{2} in R^{3}

In differential geometry, Pu's inequality, proved by Pao Ming Pu, relates the area of an arbitrary Riemannian surface homeomorphic to the real projective plane with the lengths of the closed curves contained in it.

== Statement ==
A student of Charles Loewner, Pu proved in his 1950 thesis (Pu 1952) that every Riemannian surface $M$ homeomorphic to the real projective plane satisfies the inequality

$$\operatorname{Area}(M) \geq \frac{2}{\pi} \operatorname{Systole}(M)^2 ,$$

where $\operatorname{Systole}(M)$, the systole of $M$, is the length of the shortest loop in M that cannot be contracted to a point in the ambient space X.

The equality is attained precisely when the metric has constant Gaussian curvature.

In other words, if all noncontractible loops in $M$ have length at least $L$, then $\operatorname{Area}(M) \geq \frac{2}{\pi} L^2,$ and the equality holds if and only if $M$ is obtained from a Euclidean sphere of radius $r=L/\pi$ by identifying each point with its antipodal.

Pu's paper also stated for the first time Loewner's inequality, a similar result for Riemannian metrics on the torus.

== Proof ==
Pu's original proof relies on the uniformization theorem and employs an averaging argument, as follows.

By uniformization, the Riemannian surface $(M,g)$ is conformally diffeomorphic to a round projective plane. This means that we may assume that the surface $M$ is obtained from the Euclidean unit sphere $S^2$ by identifying antipodal points, and the Riemannian length element at each point $x$ is

$$\mathrm{dLength} = f(x) \mathrm{dLength}_{\text{Euclidean}},$$

where $\mathrm{dLength}_{\text{Euclidean}}$ is the Euclidean length element and the function $f: S^2\to(0,+\infty)$, called the conformal factor, satisfies $f(-x)=f(x)$.

More precisely, the universal cover of $M$ is $S^2$, a loop $\gamma\subseteq M$ is noncontractible if and only if its lift $\widetilde\gamma\subseteq S^2$ goes from one point to its opposite, and the length of each curve $\gamma$ is

$$\operatorname{Length}(\gamma)=\int_{\widetilde\gamma} f \, \mathrm{dLength}_{\text{Euclidean}}.$$

Subject to the restriction that each of these lengths is at least $L$, we want to find an $f$ that minimizes the

$$\operatorname{Area}(M,g)=\int_{S^2_+} f(x)^2\,\mathrm{dArea}_{\text{Euclidean}}(x),$$

where $S^2_+$ is the upper half of the sphere.

A key observation is that if we average several different $f_i$ that satisfy the length restriction and have the same area $A$, then we obtain a better conformal factor $f_{\text{new}} = \frac{1}{n} \sum_{0\leq i<n} f_i$, that also satisfies the length restriction and has

$$\operatorname{Area}(M,g_{\text{new}}) = \int_{S^2_+}\left(\frac 1n\sum_i f_i(x)\right)^2\mathrm{dArea}_{\text{Euclidean}}(x)$$
$$\qquad\qquad \leq \frac{1}{n}\sum_i\left(\int_{S^2_+} f_i(x)^2\mathrm{dArea}_{\text{Euclidean}}(x)\right) = A,$$

and the inequality is strict unless the functions $f_i$ are equal.

A way to improve any non-constant $f$ is to obtain the different functions $f_i$ from $f$ using rotations of the sphere $R_i\in SO^3$, defining $f_i(x)=f(R_i(x))$. If we average over all possible rotations, then we get an $f_{\text{new}}$ that is constant over all the sphere. We can further reduce this constant to minimum value $r=\frac L\pi$ allowed by the length restriction. Then we obtain the obtain the unique metric that attains the minimum area $2\pi r^2 = \frac 2\pi L^2$.

== Reformulation ==
Alternatively, every metric on the sphere $S^2$ invariant under the antipodal map admits a pair of opposite points $p,q\in S^2$ at Riemannian distance $d=d(p,q)$ satisfying $d^2 \leq \frac{\pi}{4} \operatorname{area} (S^2).$

A more detailed explanation of this viewpoint may be found at the page Introduction to systolic geometry.

== Filling area conjecture ==
An alternative formulation of Pu's inequality is the following. Of all possible fillings of the Riemannian circle of length $2\pi$ by a $2$-dimensional disk with the strongly isometric property, the round hemisphere has the least area.

To explain this formulation, we start with the observation that the equatorial circle of the unit $2$-sphere $S^2 \subset \mathbb R^3$ is a Riemannian circle $S^1$ of length $2\pi$. More precisely, the Riemannian distance function of $S^1$ is induced from the ambient Riemannian distance on the sphere. Note that this property is not satisfied by the standard imbedding of the unit circle in the Euclidean plane. Indeed, the Euclidean distance between a pair of opposite points of the circle is only $2$, whereas in the Riemannian circle it is $\pi$.

We consider all fillings of $S^1$ by a $2$-dimensional disk, such that the metric induced by the inclusion of the circle as the boundary of the disk is the Riemannian metric of a circle of length $2\pi$. The inclusion of the circle as the boundary is then called a strongly isometric imbedding of the circle.

Gromov conjectured that the round hemisphere gives the "best" way of filling the circle even when the filling surface is allowed to have positive genus (Gromov 1983).

== Isoperimetric inequality ==
Pu's inequality bears a curious resemblance to the classical isoperimetric inequality

$$L^2 \geq 4\pi A$$

for Jordan curves in the plane, where $L$ is the length of the curve while $A$ is the area of the region it bounds. Namely, in both cases a 2-dimensional quantity (area) is bounded by (the square of) a 1-dimensional quantity (length). However, the inequality goes in the opposite direction. Thus, Pu's inequality can be thought of as an "opposite" isoperimetric inequality.

== See also ==
- Filling area conjecture
- Gromov's systolic inequality for essential manifolds
- Gromov's inequality for complex projective space
- Loewner's torus inequality
- Systolic geometry
- Systoles of surfaces
