= Firey Hill =

Mountain in New York, United States

- Location within New York Location within the United States

Highest point
- Elevation: 1,283 feet (391 m)
- Coordinates: 42°57′25″N 74°48′23″W

Geography
- Location: NW of Starkville, Herkimer County, New York, U.S.
- Topo map: USGS Van Hornesville

Firey Hill is a summit in the Central New York Region of New York. It is located northwest of Starkville, New York. Elevation: 1,273 feet.
