= Hermite constant =

Constant relating to close packing of spheres

A hexagonal lattice with unit covolume (the area of the quadrilateral is 1). Both arrows are minimum non-zero elements for $n-1$ with length $\lambda_n=\sqrt{\gamma_n}=\sqrt{2/\sqrt{3}}$.

In mathematics, the Hermite constant, named after Charles Hermite, determines how long a shortest element of a lattice in Euclidean space can be.

The constant $\gamma_n$ for integers $n>0$ is defined as follows. For a lattice $L$ in Euclidean space $\R^n$ with unit covolume, i.e. $\operatorname{vol}(\R^n/L)=1$, let $\lambda_1(L)$ denote the least length of a nonzero element of $L$. Then $\sqrt{\gamma_n}$ is the maximum of $\lambda_1(L)$ over all such lattices $L$.

The square root in the definition of the Hermite constant is a matter of historical convention.

Alternatively, the Hermite constant $\gamma_n$ can be defined as the square of the maximal systole of a flat $n$-dimensional torus of unit volume.

== Examples ==
The Hermite constant is known in dimensions 1–8 and 24.

n	1	2	3	4	5	6	7	8	24
$\gamma_n$	$1$	$\frac 2 {\sqrt 3}$	$\sqrt[3]2$	$\sqrt 2$	$\sqrt[5]8$	$\frac 2 {\sqrt[6]3}$	$\sqrt[7]{64}$	$2$	$4$

For $n=2$, one has $\gamma_2=2/\sqrt{3}$. This value is attained by the hexagonal lattice of the Eisenstein integers, scaled to have a fundamental parallelogram with unit area.

== Estimates ==
It is known that

$$\gamma_n \le \left( \frac 4 3 \right)^\frac{n-1}{2}.$$

A stronger estimate (for $n \ge 18$) due to Hans Frederick Blichfeldt is

$$\gamma_n \le \left( \frac 2 \pi \right)\Gamma\left(2 + \frac n 2\right)^\frac{2}{n},$$
where $\Gamma(x)$ is the gamma function.

Neither of these bounds are particularly tight for large $n$:

n	γ_{n}	Bounds		n	γ_{n}	Bounds	
1	1	1	3.534	13		5.619	8.691
2	1.155	1.155	4	14		6.488	9.098
3	1.26	1.333	4.454	15		7.492	9.504
4	1.414	1.540	4.899	16		8.650	9.908
5	1.516	1.778	5.337	17		9.989	10.311
6	1.665	2.053	5.769	18		11.534	10.713
7	1.811	2.370	6.196	19		13.318	11.113
8	2	2.737	6.620	20		15.379	11.512
9		3.160	7.039	21		17.758	11.909
10		3.649	7.456	22		20.505	12.307
11		4.214	7.870	23		23.677	12.703
12		4.866	8.281	24	4	27.340	13.098

== See also ==
- Loewner's torus inequality
- Minkowski's theorem
