= William J. Firey =

American mathematician (1923–2004)

- Born: January 23, 1923; Roundup, Montana, U.S.
- Died: August 20, 2004 (aged 81); Corvallis, Oregon, U.S.
- Education: University of Washington; University of Toronto; Stanford University
- Scientific career
- Fields: Mathematics
- Workplaces: Washington State University; Oregon State University
- Thesis: On Ballistically Closed Regions
- Doctoral advisor: Charles Loewner

William James Firey (1923–2004) was an American mathematician, specializing in the geometry of convex bodies.

== Life and career ==
Born in Montana, Firey moved with his family to Seattle when he was 6 years old. During World War II, he served in the U.S. Army as a medical technician in Europe. He married in 1946. During the first years of their marriage, the couple worked for the United States Forest Service during summers in fire look-out stations in the Washington Cascades.

Firey received in 1948 his bachelor's degree from the University of Washington, in 1949 his master's degree from the University of Toronto, and in 1954 his Ph.D. from Stanford University. He was a faculty member at Washington State University for 8 years and then became a professor at Oregon State University, where he retired as professor emeritus in 1988. He was a visiting professor at several universities and made several trips to the Mathematical Research Institute of Oberwolfach.

In 1974 Firey was an Invited Speaker at the International Congress of Mathematicians in Vancouver.

In addition to his professional travels, he and his wife, often joined by friends, sailed in the Pacific Northwest's San Juan and Gulf Islands, the Mediterranean seas around Greece, and the Baltic. Land travels included sojourns in France and trips to Turkey, England and Scotland, the Netherlands, Switzerland, Denmark, Greece and Mexico.

Upon his death he was survived by his widow and his daughter and predeceased by his son.

== Selected publications ==
- Firey, William J. (1961). "Polar Means of Convex Bodies and a Dual to the Brunn-Minkowski Theorem". Canadian Journal of Mathematics. 13: 444–453. doi:10.4153/CJM-1961-037-0. S2CID 124764619.
- Firey, WM. J. (1962). "$p$-Means of Convex Bodies". Mathematica Scandinavica. 10: 17–24. doi:10.7146/math.scand.a-10510. JSTOR 24489266.
- Firey, William J.; Grünbaum, Branko (1964). "Addition and decomposition of convex polytopes". Israel Journal of Mathematics. 2 (2): 91–100. doi:10.1007/BF02759949.
- Firey, W. J. (1967). "The determination of convex bodies from their mean radius of curvature functions". Mathematika. 14: 1–13. doi:10.1112/S0025579300007956.
- Firey, William J. (1968). "Christoffel's problem for general convex bodies". Mathematika. 15: 7–21. doi:10.1112/S0025579300002321.
- Firey, William J. (1974). "Shapes of worn stones". Mathematika. 21: 1–11. doi:10.1112/S0025579300005714.
