= Lusternik–Schnirelmann category =

Aspect of algebraic topology

In mathematics, the Lyusternik–Schnirelmann category (or, Lusternik–Schnirelmann category, LS-category) of a topological space $X$ is the homotopy invariant defined to be the smallest integer number $k$ such that there is an open covering $\{U_i\}_{1\leq i\leq k}$ of $X$ with the property that each inclusion map $U_i\hookrightarrow X$ is nullhomotopic.

For example, if $X$ is an $n$-sphere, this takes the value $2$. Lusternik–Schnirelmann theorem implies that the LS-category of $\mathbb{RP}^n$ is at least $n+1$ (and it is not difficult to show that $n+1$ sets suffice, so the category is exactly $n+1$).

Sometimes a different normalization of the invariant is adopted, which is one less than the definition above. Such a normalization has been adopted in the definitive monograph by Cornea, Lupton, Oprea, and Tanré (see below).

In general it is not easy to compute this invariant, which was initially introduced by Lazar Lyusternik and Lev Schnirelmann in connection with variational problems. It has a close connection with algebraic topology, in particular cup-length. In the modern normalization, the cup-length is a lower bound for the LS-category.

It was, as originally defined for the case of $X$ a manifold, the lower bound for the number of critical points that a real-valued function on $X$ could possess (this should be compared with the result in Morse theory that shows that the sum of the Betti numbers is a lower bound for the number of critical points of a Morse function).

The invariant has been generalized in several different directions (group actions, foliations, simplicial complexes, etc.).

== See also ==
- Ganea conjecture
- Systolic category
