= Entropy (video game) =

- Developer: Artplant

Entropy was a space MMORPG video game developed by the Norwegian game studio Artplant, the company which created the MMORPG Battlestar Galactica Online.

== Gameplay ==
The game was a space flight simulator played from behind the cockpit of a spaceship, with combat similar to Wing Commander and X. The game also had mining, trading, and salvaging systems.

== Release ==
=== Steam Early Access ===
The game was released through Steam Early Access on December 9, 2013, available for purchase with three different packaged offerings (from least to most expensive): Colonist, Explorer, and Founder. Purchasers of the base Colonist package will have their progress in the game wiped after the game leaves Early Access and is fully released. Rock, Paper, Shotgun writer Alec Meer questioned whether wiping the progress of low-paying customers was "a matter of choice rather than technical necessity".

=== De-activation ===
The developer removed the game from Steam on November 30, 2017. The game went offline in March 2018.
