= Systoles of surfaces =

Mathematics

In mathematics, systolic inequalities for curves on surfaces were first studied by Charles Loewner in 1949 (unpublished; see remark at end of P. M. Pu's paper in '52). Given a closed surface, its systole, denoted sys, is defined to be the least length of a loop that cannot be contracted to a point on the surface. The systolic area of a metric is defined to be the ratio area/sys^{2}. The systolic ratio SR is the reciprocal quantity sys^{2}/area. See also Introduction to systolic geometry.

== Torus ==
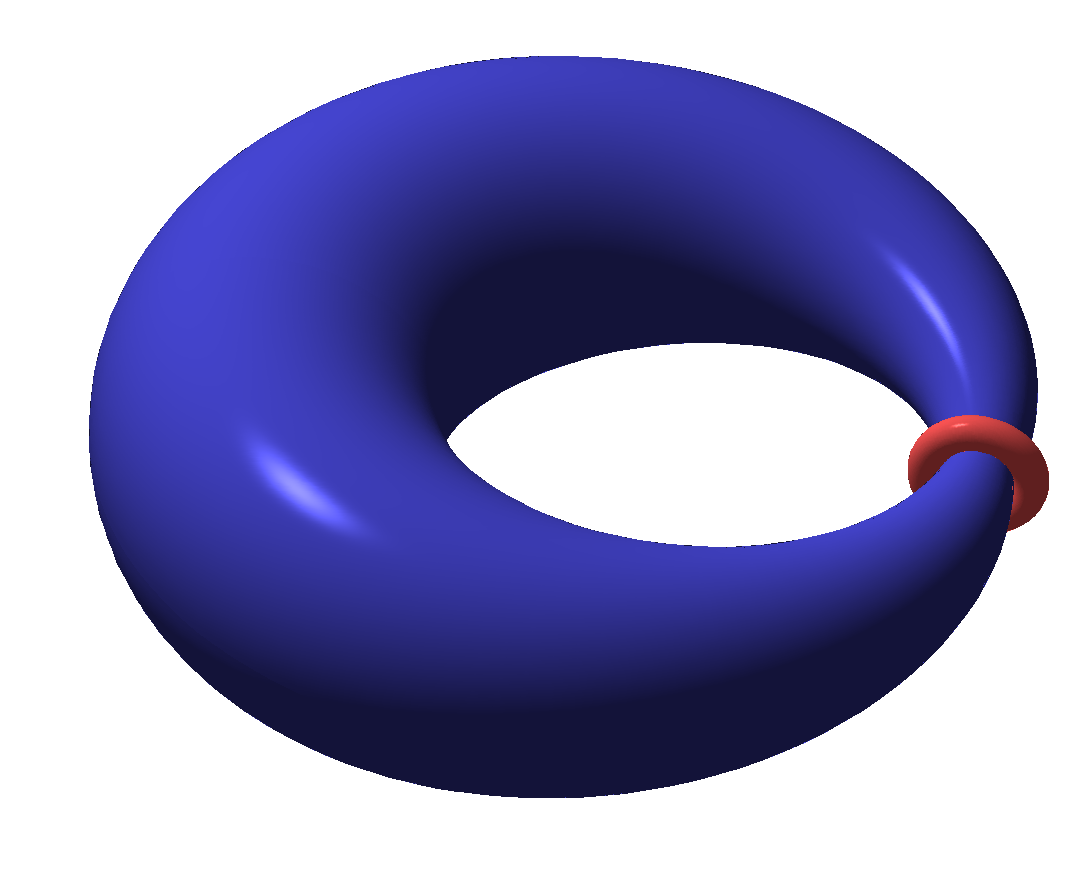
Shortest loop on a torus

In 1949 Loewner proved his inequality for metrics on the torus T^{2}, namely that the systolic ratio SR(T^{2}) is bounded above by $2/\sqrt{3}$, with equality in the flat (constant curvature) case of the equilateral torus (see hexagonal lattice).

== Real projective plane ==
A similar result is given by Pu's inequality for the real projective plane from 1952, due to Pao Ming Pu, with an upper bound of π/2 for the systolic ratio SR(RP^{2}), also attained in the constant curvature case.

== Klein bottle ==
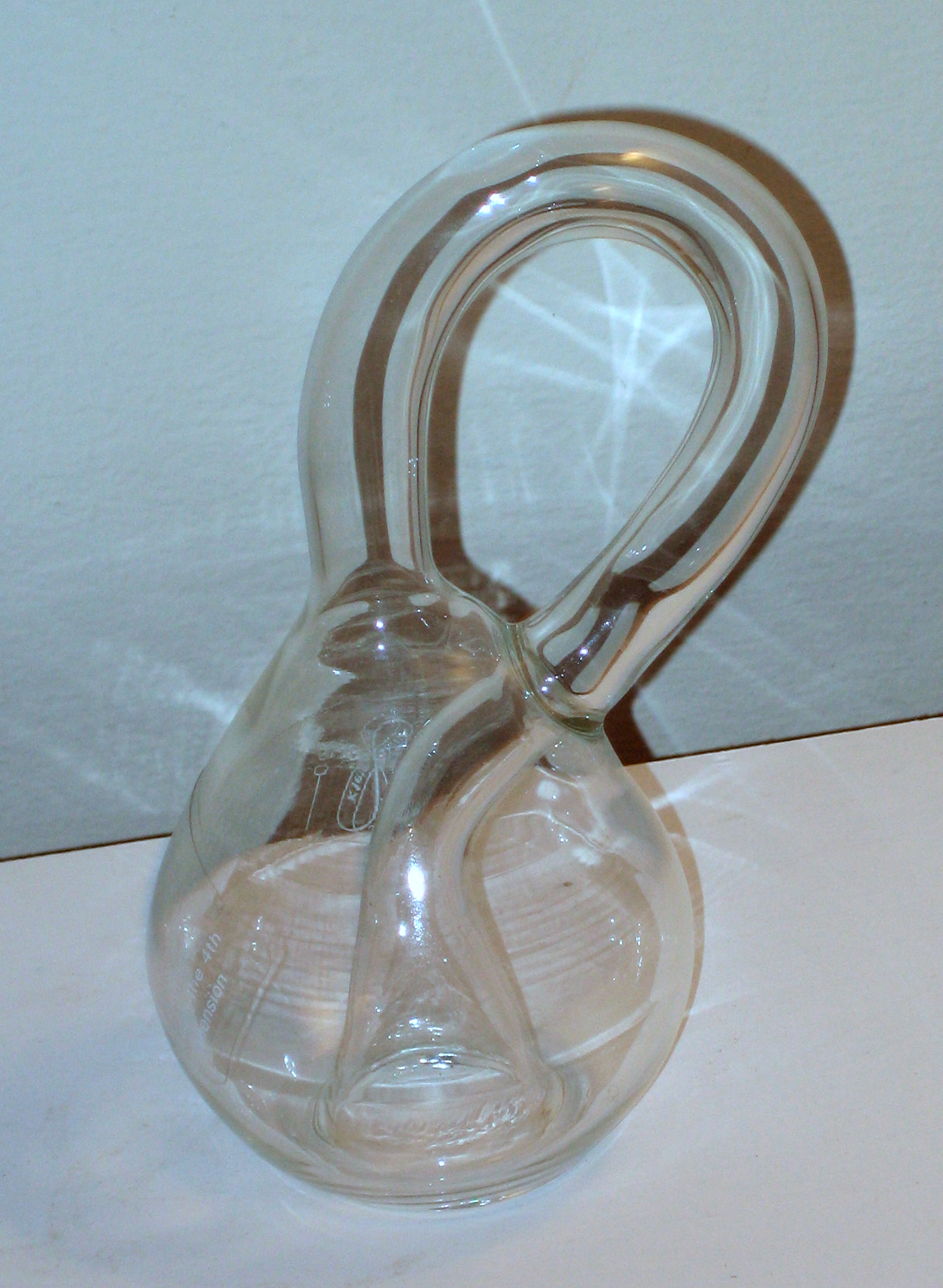
A hand-blown Klein Bottle (emulation)

For the Klein bottle K, Bavard (1986) obtained an optimal upper bound of $\pi/\sqrt{8}$ for the systolic ratio:

$$\mathrm{SR}(K) \leq  \frac{\pi}{\sqrt{8}},$$

based on work by Blatter from the 1960s.

== Genus 2 ==
An orientable surface of genus 2 satisfies Loewner's bound $\mathrm{SR}(2)\leq \tfrac{2}{\sqrt{3}}$, see (Katz-Sabourau '06). It is unknown whether or not every surface of positive genus satisfies Loewner's bound. It is conjectured that they all do. The answer is affirmative for genus 20 and above by (Katz-Sabourau '05).

== Arbitrary genus ==
For a closed surface of genus g, Hebda and Burago (1980) showed that the systolic ratio SR(g) is bounded above by the constant 2. Three years later, Mikhail Gromov found an upper bound for SR(g) given by a constant times

$$\frac{(\log g)^2}{g}.$$

A similar lower bound (with a smaller constant) was obtained by Buser and Sarnak. Namely, they exhibited arithmetic hyperbolic Riemann surfaces with systole behaving as a constant times $\log (g)$. Note that area is 4π(g-1) from the Gauss-Bonnet theorem, so that SR(g) behaves asymptotically as a constant times $\tfrac{(\log g)^2}{g}$.

The study of the asymptotic behavior for large genus $g$ of the systole of hyperbolic surfaces reveals some interesting constants. Thus, Hurwitz surfaces $\Sigma_g$ defined by a tower of principal congruence subgroups of the (2,3,7) hyperbolic triangle group satisfy the bound

$$\mathrm{sys}(\Sigma_g) \geq \frac{4}{3} \log g,$$

resulting from an analysis of the Hurwitz quaternion order. A similar bound holds for more general arithmetic Fuchsian groups. This 2007 result by Mikhail Katz, Mary Schaps, and Uzi Vishne improves an inequality due to Peter Buser and Peter Sarnak in the case of arithmetic groups defined over $\mathbb{Q}$, from 1994, which contained a nonzero additive constant. For the Hurwitz surfaces of principal congruence type, the systolic ratio SR(g) is asymptotic to

$$\frac{4}{9\pi} \frac{(\log g)^2}{g}.$$

Using Katok's entropy inequality, the following asymptotic upper bound for SR(g) was found in (Katz-Sabourau 2005):

$$\frac{(\log g)^2}{\pi g},$$

see also (Katz 2007), p. 85. Combining the two estimates, one obtains tight bounds for the asymptotic behavior of the systolic ratio of surfaces.

== Sphere ==
There is also a version of the inequality for metrics on the sphere, for the invariant L defined as the least length of a closed geodesic of the metric. In '80, Gromov conjectured a lower bound of $1/2\sqrt{3}$ for the ratio area/L^{2}. A lower bound of 1/961 obtained by Croke in '88 has recently been improved by Nabutovsky, Rotman, and Sabourau.

== See also ==
- Differential geometry of surfaces
