= Nadirashvili surface =

Negatively-curved minimal surface

In differential geometry, a Nadirashvili surface is an immersed complete bounded minimal surface in $\R^3$ with negative Gaussian curvature. The first example of such a surface was constructed by Nikolai Nadirashvili in 1996. This simultaneously answered a question of Hadamard about whether there was an immersed complete bounded surface in $\R^3$ with negative Gaussian curvature, and a question of Eugenio Calabi and Shing-Tung Yau about whether there was an immersed complete bounded minimal surface in $\R^3$.

Hilbert (1901) showed that a complete immersed surface in $\R^3$ cannot have constant negative Gaussian curvature, and Efimov (1963) show that the curvature cannot be bounded above by a negative constant. Therefore, Nadirashvili's surface necessarily has points where the Gaussian curvature is arbitrarily close to 0. As a minimal surface, its mean curvature is 0 everywhere. Topologically, it is a disk. As an immersed surface, it intersects itself; it is not embedded. These self-intersections are necessary, as Colding and Minicozzi proved in 2008 that embedded complete bounded minimal disks do not exist.
