= Essential manifold =

In geometry, an essential manifold is a special type of closed manifold. The notion was first introduced explicitly by Mikhail Gromov.

== Definition ==
A closed manifold M is called essential if its fundamental class [M] defines a nonzero element in the homology of its fundamental group π, or more precisely in the homology of the corresponding Eilenberg–MacLane space K(π, 1), via the natural homomorphism

$$H_n(M)\to H_n(K(\pi,1)),$$

where n is the dimension of M. Here the fundamental class is taken in homology with integer coefficients if the manifold is orientable, and in coefficients modulo 2, otherwise.

== Examples ==
- All closed surfaces (i.e. 2-dimensional manifolds) are essential with the exception of the 2-sphere S^{2}.
- Real projective space RP^{n} is essential since the inclusion
  $$\mathbb{RP}^n \to \mathbb{RP}^\infty$$

is injective in homology, where

$$\mathbb{RP}^\infty = K(\mathbb{Z}_2, 1)$$

is the Eilenberg–MacLane space of the finite cyclic group of order 2.

- All compact aspherical manifolds are essential (since being aspherical means the manifold itself is already a K(π, 1))
  - In particular all compact hyperbolic manifolds are essential.
- All lens spaces are essential.

== Properties ==
- The connected sum of essential manifolds is essential.
- Any manifold which admits a map of nonzero degree to an essential manifold is itself essential.

== See also ==
- Gromov's systolic inequality for essential manifolds
- Systolic geometry
