= Victor Bangert =

German mathematician

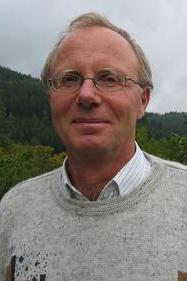
- Bangert at Oberwolfach, 2004
- Born: 28 November 1950 (age 75)
- Education: Universität Dortmund
- Scientific career
- Fields: Mathematics
- Workplaces: Albert-Ludwigs-Universität Freiburg

Victor Bangert (born 28 November 1950) is Professor of Mathematics at the Mathematisches Institut in Freiburg, Germany. His main interests are differential geometry and dynamical systems theory. He specialises in the theory of closed geodesics, wherein one of his significant results, combined with another one due to John Franks, implies that every Riemannian 2-sphere possesses infinitely many closed geodesics. He also made important contributions to Aubry–Mather theory.

He obtained his Ph.D. from Universität Dortmund in 1977 under the supervision of Rolf Wilhelm Walter, with the thesis Konvexität in riemannschen Mannigfaltigkeiten.

He served in the editorial board of "manuscripta mathematica" from 1996 to 2017.

Bangert was an invited speaker at the 1994 International Congress of Mathematicians in Zürich.

== Selected publications ==
- Bangert, Victor (1980). "Closed geodesics on complete surfaces". Mathematische Annalen. 251 (1). Springer Science and Business Media LLC: 83–96. doi:10.1007/bf01420283. ISSN 0025-5831. S2CID 121131779.
- Bangert, V.; Klingenberg, W. (1983). "Homology generated by iterated closed geodesics". Topology. 22 (4). Elsevier BV: 379–388. doi:10.1016/0040-9383(83)90033-2. ISSN 0040-9383.
- Bangert, V. (1988). "Mather Sets for Twist Maps and Geodesics on Tori". Dynamics Reported. Vol. 1. Wiesbaden: Vieweg+Teubner Verlag. pp. 1–56. doi:10.1007/978-3-322-96656-8_1. ISBN 978-3-519-02150-6. ISSN 0936-6040.
- Bangert, Victor (1990). "Minimal geodesics". Ergodic Theory and Dynamical Systems. 10 (2). Cambridge University Press (CUP): 263–286. doi:10.1017/s014338570000554x. ISSN 0143-3857. S2CID 247631967.
- Bangert, Victor (1993). "On the Existence of Closed Geodesics on Two-Spheres". International Journal of Mathematics. 04 (1). World Scientific Pub Co Pte Lt: 1–10. doi:10.1142/s0129167x93000029. ISSN 0129-167X.
- Bangert, Victor (1994). "Geodesic rays, Busemann functions and monotone twist maps". Calculus of Variations and Partial Differential Equations. 2 (1). Springer Science and Business Media LLC: 49–63. doi:10.1007/bf01234315. ISSN 0944-2669. S2CID 120188519.
- Bangert, Victor; Katz, Mikhail (24 April 2003). "Stable systolic inequalities and cohomology products". Communications on Pure and Applied Mathematics. 56 (7). Wiley: 979–997. arXiv:math/0204181. doi:10.1002/cpa.10082. ISSN 0010-3640. S2CID 14485627.
- Bangert, Victor; Katz, Mikhail G.; Shnider, Steven; Weinberger, Shmuel (15 January 2009). "E7, Wirtinger inequalities, Cayley 4-form, and homotopy". Duke Mathematical Journal. 146 (1). Duke University Press. arXiv:math/0608006. doi:10.1215/00127094-2008-061. ISSN 0012-7094. S2CID 2575584.
