= Loewner's torus inequality =

In differential geometry, Loewner's torus inequality is an inequality due to Charles Loewner. It relates the systole and the area of an arbitrary Riemannian metric on the 2-torus.

== Statement ==
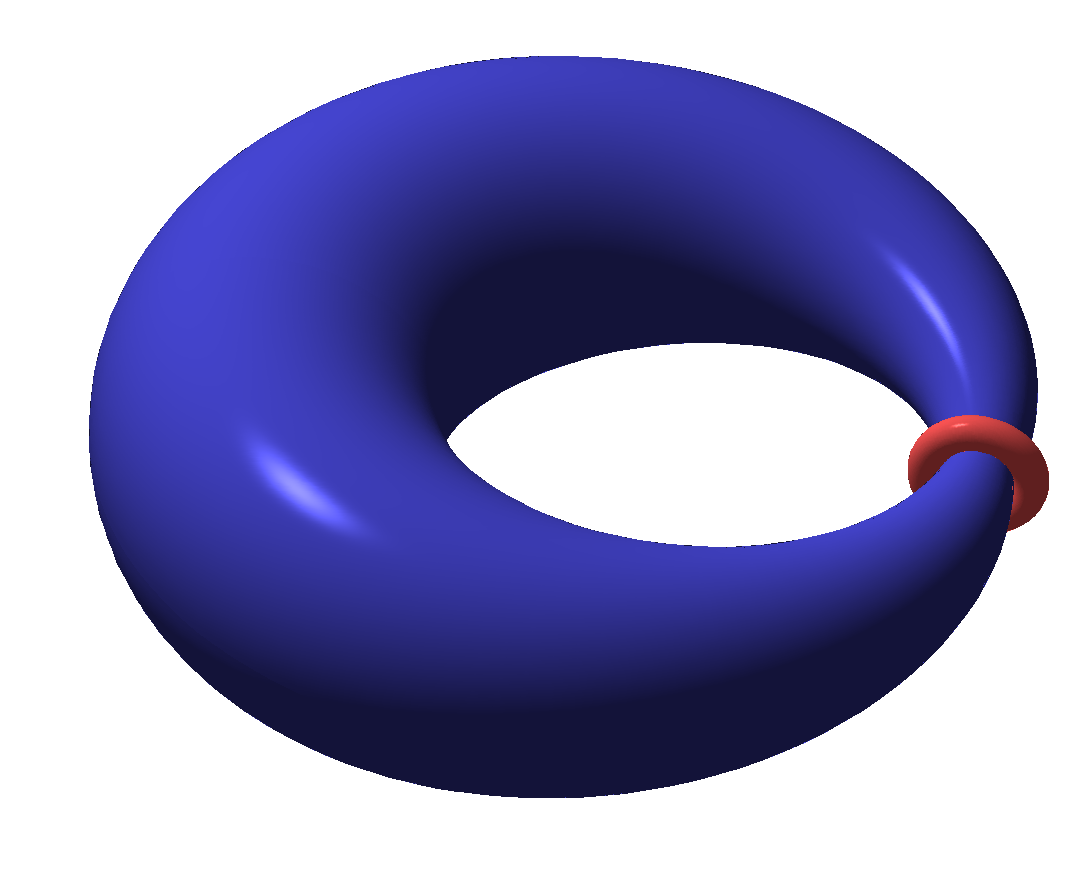
Shortest loop on a torus

In 1949 Charles Loewner proved that every metric on the 2-torus $\mathbb T^2$ satisfies the optimal inequality

$$\operatorname{sys}^2 \leq \frac{2}{\sqrt{3}} \operatorname{area}(\mathbb T^2),$$

where "sys" is its systole, i.e. least length of a noncontractible loop. The constant appearing on the right hand side is the Hermite constant $\gamma_2$ in dimension 2, so that Loewner's torus inequality can be rewritten as

$$\operatorname{sys}^2 \leq \gamma_2\;\operatorname{area}(\mathbb T^2).$$

The inequality was first mentioned in the literature in Pu (1952).

== Case of equality ==
The boundary case of equality is attained if and only if the metric is flat and homothetic to the so-called equilateral torus, i.e. torus whose group of deck transformations is precisely the hexagonal lattice spanned by the cube roots of unity in $\mathbb C$. Geometrically, this torus can be obtained by gluing opposite pairs of edges of either a regular hexagon, or a rhombus with 60° and 120° angles.

== Alternative formulation ==
Given a doubly periodic metric on $\mathbb R^2$ (e.g. an imbedding in $\mathbb R^3$ which is invariant by a $\mathbb Z^2$ isometric action), there is a nonzero element $g\in \mathbb Z^2$ and a point $p\in \mathbb R^2$ such that $\operatorname{dist}(p, g.p)^2 \leq \frac{2}{\sqrt{3}} \operatorname{area} (F)$, where $F$ is a fundamental domain for the action, while $\operatorname{dist}$ is the Riemannian distance, namely least length of a path joining $p$ and $g . p$.

== Proof of Loewner's torus inequality ==
Loewner's torus inequality can be proved most easily by using the computational formula for the variance,

$$\operatorname{E}(X^2)-(\operatorname{E}(X))^2=\mathrm{var}(X).$$

Namely, the formula is applied to the probability measure defined by the measure of the unit area flat torus in the conformal class of the given torus. For the random variable X, one takes the conformal factor of the given metric with respect to the flat one. Then the expected value E(X^{2}) of X^{2} expresses the total area of the given metric. Meanwhile, the expected value E(X) of X can be related to the systole by using Fubini's theorem. The variance of X can then be thought of as the isosystolic defect, analogous to the isoperimetric defect of Bonnesen's inequality. This approach therefore produces the following version of Loewner's torus inequality with isosystolic defect:

$$\mathrm{area}-\frac{\sqrt{3}}{2}(\mathrm{sys})^2\geq \mathrm{var}(f),$$

where ƒ is the conformal factor of the metric with respect to a unit area flat metric in its conformal class.

== Higher genus ==
Whether or not the inequality

$$(\mathrm{sys})^2 \leq \gamma_2\,\mathrm{area}$$

is satisfied by all surfaces of nonpositive Euler characteristic is unknown. For orientable surfaces of genus 2 and genus 20 and above, the answer is affirmative, see work by Katz and Sabourau below.

== See also ==
- Pu's inequality for the real projective plane
- Gromov's systolic inequality for essential manifolds
- Gromov's inequality for complex projective space
- Eisenstein integer (an example of a hexagonal lattice)
- Systoles of surfaces
