= Mikhail Katz =

Israeli mathematician

- מיכאיל כץ
- Born: 1958 (age 67–68); Chișinău, Moldavian SSR
- Education: Harvard University (BA); Columbia University (PhD)
- Scientific career
- Fields: Mathematics
- Workplaces: Bar-Ilan University
- Thesis: Jung's Theorem in Complex Projective Geometry
- Doctoral advisor: Troels Jørgensen; Mikhail Gromov
- Website: http://u.cs.biu.ac.il/~katzmik/

Mikhail "Mischa" Gershevich Katz (/kæts/, Hebrew: מיכאיל כץ; born 1958) is an Israeli mathematician and professor of mathematics at Bar-Ilan University. His main interests are differential geometry, geometric topology, nonstandard analysis, and mathematics education; he is the author of the book Systolic Geometry and Topology, which is mainly about systolic geometry. The Katz–Sabourau inequality is named after him and Stéphane Sabourau.

== Biography ==
Mikhail Katz was born in Chișinău in 1958. His mother was Clara Katz (née Landman). In 1976, he moved with his mother to the United States.

Katz earned a bachelor's degree in 1980 from Harvard University. He did his graduate studies at Columbia University, receiving his Ph.D. in 1984 under the joint supervision of Troels Jørgensen and Mikhael Gromov. His thesis title is Jung's Theorem in Complex Projective Geometry.

He moved to Bar-Ilan University in 1999, after previously holding positions at the University of Maryland, College Park, Stony Brook University, Indiana University Bloomington, the Institut des Hautes Études Scientifiques, the University of Rennes 1, Henri Poincaré University, and Tel Aviv University.

== Work ==
Katz has performed research in systolic geometry in collaboration with Luigi Ambrosio, Victor Bangert, Mikhail Gromov, Steve Shnider, Shmuel Weinberger, and others. He has authored research publications appearing in journals including Communications on Pure and Applied Mathematics, Duke Mathematical Journal, Geometric and Functional Analysis, and Journal of Differential Geometry. Along with these papers, Katz was a contributor to the book "Metric Structures for Riemannian and Non-Riemannian Spaces". Marcel Berger in his article "What is... a Systole?" lists Katz's 2007 book Systolic Geometry and Topology as one of two books he cites in systolic geometry.

More recently Katz also contributed to the study of mathematics education, including work that provides an alternative interpretation of the number 0.999....
