= Hexagonal lattice =

One of the five 2D Bravais lattices

Hexagonal lattice	Wallpaper group p6m	Unit cell

The hexagonal lattice (sometimes called triangular lattice) is one of the five two-dimensional Bravais lattice types. The symmetry category of the lattice is wallpaper group p6m. The primitive translation vectors of the hexagonal lattice form an angle of 120° and are of equal lengths,

$$|\mathbf a_1| = |\mathbf a_2| = a.$$

The reciprocal lattice of the hexagonal lattice is a hexagonal lattice in reciprocal space with orientation changed by 90° and primitive lattice vectors of length

$$g=\frac{4\pi}{a\sqrt 3}.$$

== Honeycomb point set ==
Honeycomb point set as a hexagonal lattice with a two-atom basis. The gray rhombus is a primitive cell. Vectors $\mathbf a_1$ and $\mathbf a_2$ are primitive translation vectors.

The honeycomb point set is a special case of the hexagonal lattice with a two-atom basis. The centers of the hexagons of a honeycomb form a hexagonal lattice, and the honeycomb point set can be seen as the union of two offset hexagonal lattices.

In nature, carbon atoms of the two-dimensional material graphene are arranged in a honeycomb point set.

== Crystal classes ==
The hexagonal lattice class names, Schönflies notation, Hermann-Mauguin notation, orbifold notation, Coxeter notation, and wallpaper groups are listed in the table below.

Geometric class, point group				Wallpaper groups	
Schön.	Intl	Orb.	Cox.	Wallpaper groups	
C_{3}	3	(33)	[3]^{+}	p3 (333)	
D_{3}	3m	(*33)	[3]	p3m1 (*333)	p31m (3*3)
C_{6}	6	(66)	[6]^{+}	p6 (632)	
D_{6}	6mm	(*66)	[6]	p6m (*632)	

== See also ==
- Square lattice (see dots in a diagonal square centered)
- Hexagonal tiling
- Close-packing
- Centered hexagonal number
- Eisenstein integer
- Voronoi diagram
- Hermite constant
