= Bolza surface =

In mathematics, a Riemann surface

In mathematics, the Bolza surface, alternatively, complex algebraic Bolza curve (introduced by Oskar Bolza (1887)), is a compact Riemann surface of genus $2$ with the highest possible order of the conformal automorphism group in this genus, namely $GL_2(3)$ of order 48 (the general linear group of $2\times 2$ matrices over the finite field $\mathbb{F}_3$). Its full automorphism group (including reflections) is a semi-direct product $GL_{2}(3)\rtimes\mathbb{Z}_{2}$ of order 96. (GAP identifies these two groups as SmallGroup(48,29) and SmallGroup(96,193).) An affine model for the Bolza surface can be obtained as the locus of the equation

$$y^2=x^5-x$$

in $\mathbb C^2$. The Bolza surface is the smooth completion of this affine curve. The Bolza curve also arises as a branched double cover of the Riemann sphere with branch points at the six vertices of a regular octahedron inscribed in the sphere. This can be seen from the equation above, because the right-hand side becomes zero or infinite at the six points $x = 0, 1, i, -1, -i, \infty$.

The Bolza surface has attracted the attention of physicists, as it provides a relatively simple model for quantum chaos; in this context, it is usually referred to as the Hadamard–Gutzwiller model. The spectral theory of the Laplace–Beltrami operator acting on functions on the Bolza surface is of interest to both mathematicians and physicists, since the surface is conjectured to maximize the first positive eigenvalue of the Laplacian among all compact, closed Riemann surfaces of genus $2$ with constant negative curvature. Eigenvectors of the Laplace-Beltrami operator are quantum analogues of periodic orbits, and as a classical analogue of this conjecture, it is known that of all genus $2$ hyperbolic surfaces, the Bolza surface maximizes the length of the shortest closed geodesic, or systole (Schmutz 1993).

== Triangle surface ==
The tiling of the Bolza surface by reflection domains is a quotient of the order-3 bisected octagonal tiling.

The fundamental domain of the Bolza surface in the Poincaré disk; opposite sides are identified.

The Bolza surface is conformally equivalent to a $(2,3,8)$ triangle surface – see Schwarz triangle. More specifically, the Fuchsian group defining the Bolza surface is a subgroup of the group generated by reflections in the sides of a hyperbolic triangle with angles $\tfrac{\pi}{2}, \tfrac{\pi}{3}, \tfrac{\pi}{8}$. The group of orientation preserving isometries is a subgroup of the index-two subgroup of the group of reflections, which consists of products of an even number of reflections, which has an abstract presentation in terms of generators $s_2, s_3, s_8$ and relations $s_2{}^2=s_3{}^3=s_8{}^8=1$ as well as $s_2 s_3 = s_8$. The Fuchsian group $\Gamma$ defining the Bolza surface is also a subgroup of the (3,3,4) triangle group, which is a subgroup of index 2 in the $(2,3,8)$ triangle group. The $(2,3,8)$ group does not have a realization as the order-$2$ quotient of the group of norm-$1$ elements of a quaternion algebra, but the $(3,3,4)$ group does.

Under the action of $\Gamma$ on the Poincaré disk, the fundamental domain of the Bolza surface is a regular octagon with angles $\tfrac{\pi}{4}$ and corners at

$$p_k=2^{-1/4}e^{i\left(\tfrac{\pi}{8}+\tfrac{k\pi}{4}\right)},$$

where $k=0,\ldots, 7$. Opposite sides of the octagon are identified under the action of the Fuchsian group. Its generators are the matrices

$$g_k=\begin{pmatrix}1+\sqrt{2} & (2+\sqrt{2})\alpha e^{\tfrac{ik\pi}{4}}\\(2+\sqrt{2})\alpha e^{ -\tfrac{ik\pi}{4}} & 1+\sqrt{2}\end{pmatrix},$$

where $\alpha=\sqrt{\sqrt{2}-1}$ and $k=0,\ldots, 3$, along with their inverses. The generators satisfy the relation

$$g_0 g_1^{-1} g_2 g_3^{-1} g_0^{-1} g_1 g_2^{-1} g_3=1.$$

These generators are connected to the length spectrum, which is the set of all the possible lengths of geodesic loops. The shortest such length is called the systole of the surface. The systole of the Bolza surface is

$$\ell_1=2\operatorname{\rm arcosh}(1+\sqrt{2})\approx 3.05714.$$

The $n^\text{th}$ element $\ell_n$ of the length spectrum for the Bolza surface is given by

$$\ell_n=2\operatorname{\rm arcosh}(m+n\sqrt{2}),$$

where $n$ runs through the positive integers (but omitting 4, 24, 48, 72, 140, and various higher values) (Aurich, Bogomolny & Steiner 1991) and where $m$ is the unique odd integer that minimizes

$$\vert m-n\sqrt{2}\vert.$$

It is possible to obtain an equivalent closed form of the systole directly from the triangle group. Formulae exist to calculate the side lengths of a (2,3,8) triangles explicitly. The systole is equal to four times the length of the side of medial length in a (2,3,8) triangle, that is,

$$\ell_1=4\operatorname{\rm arcosh}\left(\tfrac{\csc\left(\tfrac{\pi}{8}\right)}{2}\right)\approx 3.05714.$$

The geodesic lengths $\ell_n$ also appear in the Fenchel–Nielsen coordinates of the surface. A set of Fenchel-Nielsen coordinates for a surface of genus 2 consists of three pairs, each pair being a length and twist. Perhaps the simplest such set of coordinates for the Bolza surface is $(\ell_2,\tfrac{1}{2};\; \ell_1,0;\; \ell_1,0)$, where $\ell_2=2\operatorname{\rm arcosh}(3+2\sqrt{2})\approx 4.8969$.

There is also a "symmetric" set of coordinates $(\ell_1,t;\; \ell_1,t;\; \ell_1,t)$, where all three of the lengths are the systole $\ell_1$ and all three of the twists are given by

$$t=\frac{\operatorname{\rm arcosh}\left(\sqrt{\tfrac{2}{7}(3+\sqrt{2})}\right)}{\operatorname{\rm arcosh}(1+\sqrt{2})}\approx 0.321281.$$

== Symmetries of the surface ==
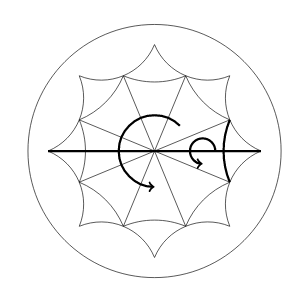
The four generators of the symmetry group of the Bolza surface

The symmetry of the Bolza surface can be understood in terms of its tiling by 16 equilateral hyperbolic triangles, 8 per vertex. Focusing on one particular choice among the 16 triangles, call it T, any symmetry of the Bolza surface must carry T to one of the 16 triangles (possibly itself). Call this triangle T'. Triangle T can map to T' in any of exactly 6 ways that preserve distance, one for each permutation of its vertices. This shows there are 6×16 = 96 symmetries in all.

One common choice of fundamental domain for the Bolza surface is a regular octagon in the Poincaré disk; the four symmetric actions that generate the (full) symmetry group are:

- R – rotation of order 8 about the centre of the octagon;
- S – reflection in the real line;
- T – reflection in the side of one of the 16 (4,4,4) triangles that tessellate the octagon;
- U – rotation of order 3 about the centre of a (4,4,4) triangle.

These are shown by the bold lines in the adjacent figure. They satisfy the following set of relations:

$$\langle R,\,S,\,T,\,U\mid R^8=S^2=T^2=U^3=RSRS=STST=RURU=SUSU=R^7 USTU=R^4 UR^4 U^2 = e \rangle,$$

where $e$ is the trivial (identity) action. The first nine of those relations take the octagon shown to itself, but the last takes it to a neighboring octagon that shares an edge. One may use this set of relations in GAP to retrieve information about the representation theory of the group (which GAP identifies as SmallGroup(96,193)). In particular, there are four 1-dimensional, two 2-dimensional, four 3-dimensional, and three 4-dimensional irreducible representations, and

$$4(1^2)+2(2^2)+4(3^2)+3(4^2)=96$$

as expected.

Another presentation of the full symmetry group starts with the triangle group $\Delta(2,3,8)$. Letting s, l, and h denote flipping across the short leg, long leg, or hypotenuse of the triangle, the full symmetry group is

$$\langle s,l,h\mid s^2=l^2=h^2=(sl)^2=(sh)^3=(l h)^8=(sh(l h)^3)^2 = e \rangle,$$

where that last relation, the one that doesn't hold in the full triangle group, walks along a geodesic whose length is the systole $\ell_1$.

== Spectral theory ==
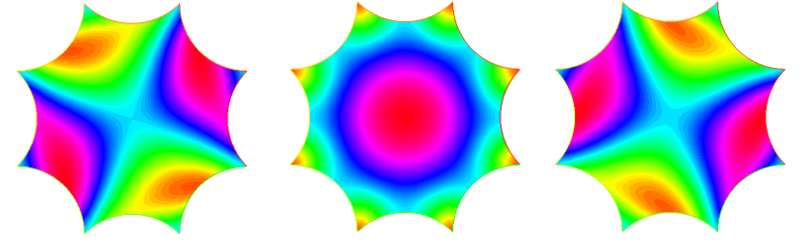
Plots of the three eigenfunctions corresponding to the first positive eigenvalue of the Bolza surface. Functions are zero on the light blue lines. These plots were produced using FreeFEM++.

Here, spectral theory refers to the spectrum of the Laplacian, $\Delta$. The first eigenspace (that is, the eigenspace corresponding to the first positive eigenvalue) of the Bolza surface is three-dimensional, and the second, four-dimensional (Cook 2018), (Jenni 1981). It is thought that investigating perturbations of the nodal lines of functions in the first eigenspace in Teichmüller space will yield the conjectured result in the introduction. This conjecture is based on extensive numerical computations of eigenvalues of the surface and other surfaces of genus 2. In particular, the spectrum of the Bolza surface is known to a very high accuracy (Strohmaier & Uski 2013). The following table gives the first ten positive eigenvalues of the Bolza surface.

Numerical computations of the first ten positive eigenvalues of the Bolza surface
| Eigenvalue | Numerical value | Multiplicity |
|---|---|---|
| $\lambda_0$ | 0 | 1 |
| $\lambda_1$ | 3.8388872588421995185866224504354645970819150157 | 3 |
| $\lambda_2$ | 5.353601341189050410918048311031446376357372198 | 4 |
| $\lambda_3$ | 8.249554815200658121890106450682456568390578132 | 2 |
| $\lambda_4$ | 14.72621678778883204128931844218483598373384446932 | 4 |
| $\lambda_5$ | 15.04891613326704874618158434025881127570452711372 | 3 |
| $\lambda_6$ | 18.65881962726019380629623466134099363131475471461 | 3 |
| $\lambda_7$ | 20.5198597341420020011497712606420998241440266544635 | 4 |
| $\lambda_8$ | 23.0785584813816351550752062995745529967807846993874 | 1 |
| $\lambda_9$ | 28.079605737677729081562207945001124964945310994142 | 3 |
| $\lambda_{10}$ | 30.833042737932549674243957560470189329562655076386 | 4 |

The spectral determinant and Casimir energy $\zeta(-1/2)$ of the Bolza surface are

$$\det{}_{\zeta}(\Delta)\approx 4.72273280444557$$

and

$$\zeta_\Delta(-1/2)\approx -0.65000636917383$$

respectively, where all decimal places are believed to be correct. It is conjectured that the spectral determinant is maximized in genus 2 for the Bolza surface.

== Jacobian ==
The Jacobian variety of the Bolza curve is the product of two copies of the elliptic curve $\mathbb{C}/\mathbb{Z}[\sqrt{-2}]$.

== Quaternion algebra ==
The quaternion algebra describing the $(3,3,4)$ triangle group can be taken to be the algebra over $\mathbb{Q}(\sqrt{2})$ generated as an associative algebra by generators i,j and relations

$$i^2=-3,\;j^2=\sqrt{2},\;ij=-ji,$$

with an appropriate choice of an order.

== See also ==
- Hyperelliptic curve
- Klein quartic
- Bring's curve
- Macbeath surface
- First Hurwitz triplet
