= Klein quartic =

Compact Riemann surface of genus 3

The Klein quartic with the two dual Klein graphs (14-gon edges marked with the same number are equal.) The Klein quartic is a quotient of the heptagonal tiling (compare the 3-regular graph in green) and its dual triangular tiling (compare the 7-regular graph in violet).

In hyperbolic geometry, the Klein quartic, named after Felix Klein, is a compact Riemann surface of genus 3 with the highest possible order automorphism group for this genus, namely order 168 orientation-preserving automorphisms, and 168 × 2 = 336 automorphisms if orientation may be reversed. As such, the Klein quartic is the Hurwitz surface of lowest possible genus; see Hurwitz's automorphisms theorem. Its (orientation-preserving) automorphism group is isomorphic to PSL(2, 7), the second-smallest non-abelian simple group after the alternating group A_{5}. The quartic was first described in (Klein 1878b).

Klein's quartic occurs in many branches of mathematics, in contexts including representation theory, homology theory, Fermat's Last Theorem, and the Stark–Heegner theorem on imaginary quadratic number fields of class number one; see (Levy 1999) for a survey of properties.

Originally, the "Klein quartic" referred specifically to the subset of the complex projective plane P^{2}(C) defined by an algebraic equation. This has a specific Riemannian metric (that makes it a minimal surface in P^{2}(C)), under which its Gaussian curvature is not constant. But more commonly (as in this article) it is now thought of as any Riemann surface that is conformally equivalent to this algebraic curve, and especially the one that is a quotient of the hyperbolic plane H^{2} by a certain cocompact group G that acts freely on H^{2} by isometries. This gives the Klein quartic a Riemannian metric of constant curvature −1 that it inherits from H^{2}. This set of conformally equivalent Riemannian surfaces is precisely the same as all compact Riemannian surfaces of genus 3 whose conformal automorphism group is isomorphic to the unique simple group of order 168. This group is also known as PSL(2, 7), and also as the isomorphic group PSL(3, 2). By covering space theory, the group G mentioned above is isomorphic to the fundamental group of the compact surface of genus 3.

== Closed and open forms ==
It is important to distinguish two different forms of the quartic. The closed quartic is what is generally meant in geometry; topologically it has genus 3 and is a compact space. The open or "punctured" quartic is of interest in number theory; topologically it is a genus 3 surface with 24 punctures, and geometrically these punctures are cusps. The open quartic may be obtained (topologically) from the closed quartic by puncturing at the 24 centers of the tiling by regular heptagons, as discussed below. The open and closed quartics have different metrics, though they are both hyperbolic and complete – geometrically, the cusps are "points at infinity", not holes, hence the open quartic is still complete.

== As an algebraic curve ==
The Klein quartic can be viewed as a projective algebraic curve over the complex numbers C, defined by the following quartic equation in homogeneous coordinates [x:y:z] on P^{2}(C):

$$x^3y + y^3z + z^3x = 0.$$

The locus of this equation in P^{2}(C) is the original Riemannian surface that Klein described.

== Quaternion algebra construction ==
The compact Klein quartic can be constructed as the quotient of the hyperbolic plane by the action of a suitable Fuchsian group Γ(I) which is the principal congruence subgroup associated with the ideal $I=\langle \eta-2\rangle$ in the ring of algebraic integers Z(η) of the field Q(η) where η = 2 cos(2π/7). Note the identity

$$(2-\eta)^3= 7(\eta-1)^2,$$

exhibiting 2 – η as a prime factor of 7 in the ring of algebraic integers.

The group Γ(I) is a subgroup of the (2,3,7) hyperbolic triangle group. Namely, Γ(I) is a subgroup of the group of elements of unit norm in the quaternion algebra generated as an associative algebra by the generators i,j and relations

$$i^2=j^2=\eta, \qquad ij=-ji.$$

One chooses a suitable Hurwitz quaternion order $\mathcal Q_{\mathrm{Hur}}$ in the quaternion algebra, Γ(I) is then the group of norm 1 elements in $1+I\mathcal Q_{\mathrm{Hur}}$. The least absolute value of a trace of a hyperbolic element in Γ(I) is $\eta^2+3\eta+2$, corresponding the value 3.936 for the systole of the Klein quartic, one of the highest in this genus.

== Tiling ==
The tiling of the quartic by reflection domains is a quotient of the 3-7 kisrhombille.

The Klein quartic admits tilings connected with the symmetry group (a "regular map"), and these are used in understanding the symmetry group, dating back to Klein's original paper. Given a fundamental domain for the group action (for the full, orientation-reversing symmetry group, a (2,3,7) triangle), the reflection domains (images of this domain under the group) give a tiling of the quartic such that the automorphism group of the tiling equals the automorphism group of the surface – reflections in the lines of the tiling correspond to the reflections in the group (reflections in the lines of a given fundamental triangle give a set of 3 generating reflections). This tiling is a quotient of the order-3 bisected heptagonal tiling of the hyperbolic plane (the universal cover of the quartic), and all Hurwitz surfaces are tiled in the same way, as quotients.

This tiling is uniform but not regular (it is by scalene triangles), and often regular tilings are used instead. A quotient of any tiling in the (2,3,7) family can be used (and will have the same automorphism group); of these, the two regular tilings are the tiling by 24 regular hyperbolic heptagons, each of degree 3 (meeting at 56 vertices), and the dual tiling by 56 equilateral triangles, each of degree 7 (meeting at 24 vertices). The order of the automorphism group is related, being the number of polygons times the number of edges in the polygon in both cases.

24 × 7 = 168
56 × 3 = 168

The covering tilings on the hyperbolic plane are the order-3 heptagonal tiling and the order-7 triangular tiling.

The automorphism group can be augmented (by a symmetry which is not realized by a symmetry of the tiling) to yield the Mathieu group M_{24}.

Corresponding to each tiling of the quartic (partition of the quartic variety into subsets) is an abstract polyhedron, which abstracts from the geometry and only reflects the combinatorics of the tiling (this is a general way of obtaining an abstract polytope from a tiling) – the vertices, edges, and faces of the polyhedron are equal as sets to the vertices, edges, and faces of the tiling, with the same incidence relations, and the (combinatorial) automorphism group of the abstract polyhedron equals the (geometric) automorphism group of the quartic. In this way the geometry reduces to combinatorics.

=== Affine quartic ===
The above is a tiling of the projective quartic (a closed manifold); the affine quartic has 24 cusps (topologically, punctures), which correspond to the 24 vertices of the regular triangular tiling, or equivalently the centers of the 24 heptagons in the heptagonal tiling, and can be realized as follows.

Considering the action of SL(2, R) on the upper half-plane model H^{2} of the hyperbolic plane by Möbius transformations, the affine Klein quartic can be realized as the quotient Γ(7)\H^{2}. (Here Γ(7) is the congruence subgroup of SL(2, Z) consisting of matrices that are congruent to the identity matrix when all entries are taken modulo 7.)

== Fundamental domain and pants decomposition ==
The Klein quartic can be obtained as the quotient of the hyperbolic plane by the action of a Fuchsian group. The fundamental domain is a regular 14-gon, which has area $8\pi$ by the Gauss-Bonnet theorem. This can be seen in the adjoining figure, which also includes the 336 (2,3,7) triangles that tessellate the surface and generate its group of symmetries.

The fundamental domain of the Klein quartic. The surface is obtained by associating sides with equal numbers.

Within the tessellation by (2,3,7) triangles is a tessellation by 24 regular heptagons. The systole of the surface passes through the midpoints of 8 heptagon sides; for this reason it has been referred to as an "eight step geodesic" in the literature, and is the reason for the title of the book in the section below. All the coloured curves in the figure showing the pants decomposition are systoles, however, this is just a subset; there are 21 in total. The length of the systole is

$$16\sinh^{-1}\left(\left(\tfrac{1}{2}\sqrt{\csc^2\left(\tfrac{\pi}{7}\right)-4}\right)\sin\left(\tfrac{\pi}{7}\right)\right)\approx3.93594624883.$$

An equivalent closed formula is

$$8\cosh^{-1}\left(\tfrac{3}{2}-2\sin^2\left(\tfrac{\pi}{7}\right)\right).$$

Whilst the Klein quartic maximises the symmetry group for surfaces of genus 3, it does not maximise the systole length. The conjectured maximiser is the surface referred to as "M3" (Schmutz 1993). M3 comes from a tessellation of (2,3,12) triangles, and its systole has multiplicity 24 and length

$$2\cosh^{-1}\left(2+\sqrt{3}\right)\approx3.9833047820988736.$$

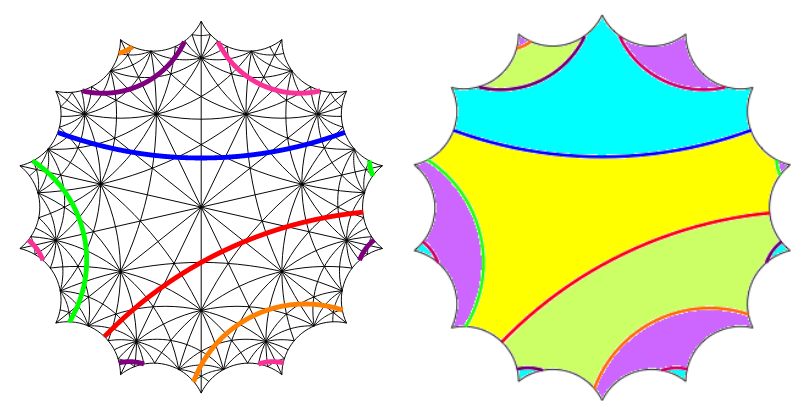
A pants decomposition of the Klein quartic. The figure on the left shows the boundary geodesics in the (2,3,7) tessellation of the fundamental domain. In the figure to the right, the pants have each been coloured differently to make it clear which part of the fundamental domain belongs to which pair of pants.

The Klein quartic can be decomposed into four pairs of pants by cutting along six of its systoles. This decomposition gives a symmetric set of Fenchel-Nielsen coordinates, where the length parameters are all equal to the length of the systole, and the twist parameters are all equal to $\tfrac{1}{8}$ of the length of the systole. In particular, taking $l(S)$ to be the systole length, the coordinates are

$$\left\{l(S),\tfrac{l(S)}{8};l(S),\tfrac{l(S)}{8};l(S),\tfrac{l(S)}{8};l(S),\tfrac{l(S)}{8};l(S),\tfrac{l(S)}{8};l(S),\tfrac{l(S)}{8}\right\}.$$

The cubic graph corresponding to this pants decomposition is the tetrahedral graph, that is, the graph of 4 nodes, each connected to the other 3. The tetrahedral graph is similar to the graph for the projective Fano plane; indeed, the automorphism group of the Klein quartic is isomorphic to that of the Fano plane.

== Spectral theory ==
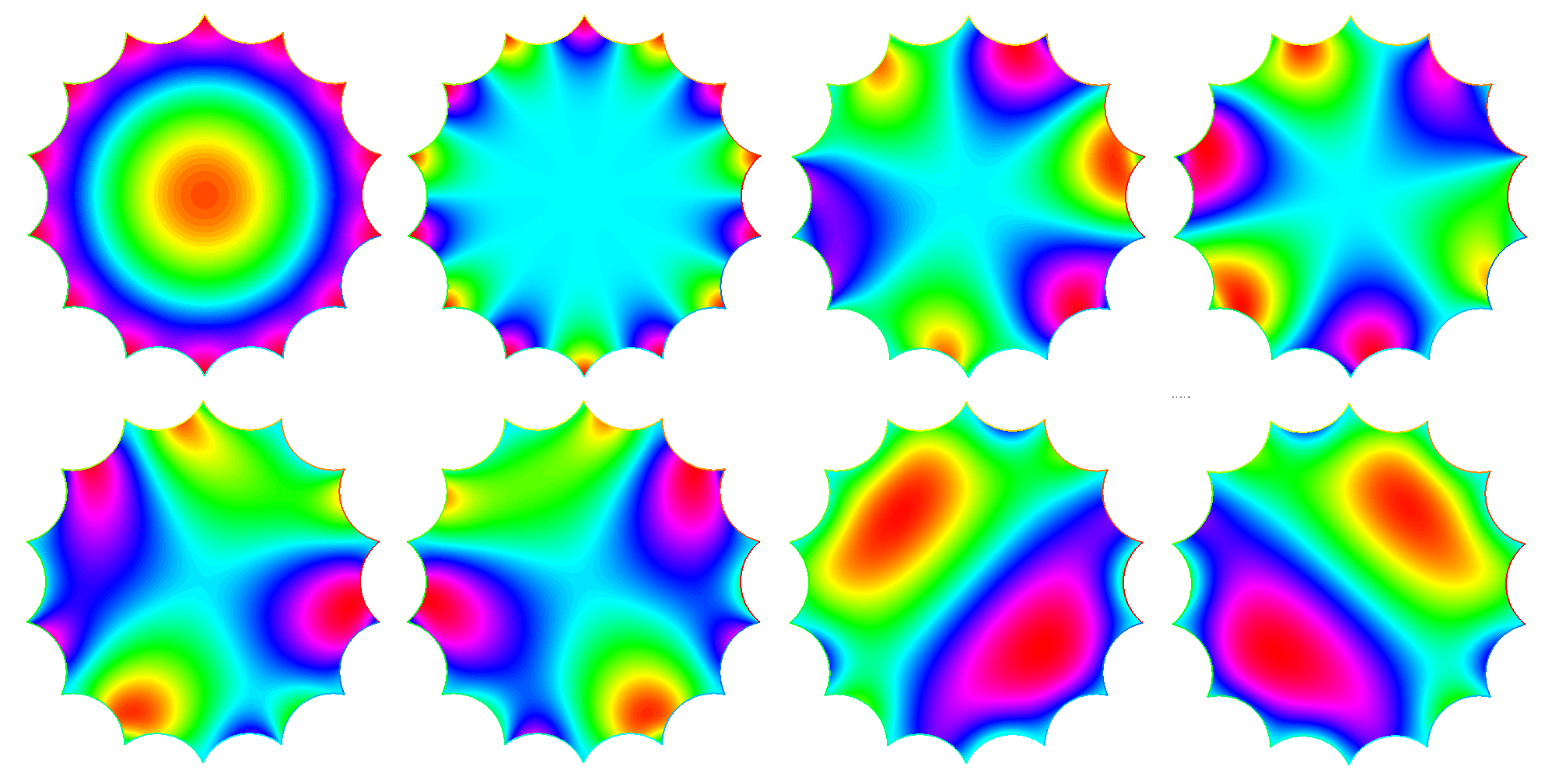
The eight functions corresponding to the first positive eigenvalue of the Klein quartic. The functions are zero along the light blue lines. These plots were produced in FreeFEM++.

Little has been proved about the spectral theory of the Klein quartic. Because the Klein quartic has the largest symmetry group of surfaces in its topological class, much like the Bolza surface in genus 2, it has been conjectured that it maximises the first positive eigenvalue of the Laplace operator among all compact Riemann surfaces of genus 3 with constant negative curvature. It also maximizes multiplicity of the first positive eigenvalue (8) among all such surfaces, a fact that has been recently proved. Eigenvalues of the Klein quartic have been calculated to varying degrees of accuracy. The first 15 distinct positive eigenvalues are shown in the following table, along with their multiplicities.

Numerical computations of the first 15 positive eigenvalues of the Klein quartic
Eigenvalue	Numerical value	Multiplicity
$\lambda_0$	0	1
$\lambda_1$	2.67793	8
$\lambda_2$	6.62251	7
$\lambda_3$	10.8691	6
$\lambda_4$	12.1844	8
$\lambda_5$	17.2486	7
$\lambda_6$	21.9705	7
$\lambda_7$	24.0811	8
$\lambda_8$	25.9276	6
$\lambda_9$	30.8039	6
$\lambda_{10}$	36.4555	8
$\lambda_{11}$	37.4246	8
$\lambda_{12}$	41.5131	6
$\lambda_{13}$	44.8884	8
$\lambda_{14}$	49.0429	6
$\lambda_{15}$	50.6283	6

== 3-dimensional models ==
An animation by Greg Egan showing an embedding of Klein's Quartic Curve in three dimensions, starting in a form that has the symmetries of a tetrahedron, and turning inside out to demonstrate a further symmetry.

The Klein quartic cannot be realized as a 3-dimensional figure, in the sense that no 3-dimensional figure has (rotational) symmetries equal to PSL(2,7), since PSL(2,7) does not embed as a subgroup of SO(3) (or O(3)) – it does not have a (non-trivial) 3-dimensional linear representation over the real numbers.

However, many 3-dimensional models of the Klein quartic have been given, starting in Klein's original paper, which seek to demonstrate features of the quartic and preserve the symmetries topologically, though not all geometrically. The resulting models most often have either tetrahedral (order 12) or octahedral (order 24) symmetries; the remaining order 7 symmetry cannot be as easily visualized, and in fact is the title of Klein's paper.

The Eightfold Way – sculpture by Helaman Ferguson and accompanying book.

Most often, the quartic is modeled either by a smooth genus 3 surface with tetrahedral symmetry (replacing the edges of a regular tetrahedron with tubes/handles yields such a shape), which have been dubbed "tetruses", or by polyhedral approximations, which have been dubbed "tetroids"; in both cases this is an embedding of the shape in 3 dimensions. The most notable smooth model (tetrus) is the sculpture The Eightfold Way by Helaman Ferguson at the Simons Laufer Mathematical Sciences Institute in Berkeley, California, made of marble and serpentine, and unveiled on November 14, 1993. The title refers to the fact that starting at any vertex of the triangulated surface and moving along any edge, if you alternately turn left and right when reaching a vertex, you always return to the original point after eight edges. The acquisition of the sculpture led in due course to the publication of a book of papers (Levy 1999), detailing properties of the quartic and containing the first English translation of Klein's paper. Polyhedral models with tetrahedral symmetry most often have convex hull a truncated tetrahedron – see (Schulte & Wills 1985) and (Scholl, Schürmann & Wills 2002) for examples and illustrations. Some of these models consist of 20 triangles or 56 triangles (abstractly, the regular skew polyhedron {3,7|,4}, with 56 faces, 84 edges, and 24 vertices), which cannot be realized as equilateral, with twists in the arms of the tetrahedron; while others have 24 heptagons – these heptagons can be taken to be planar, though non-convex, and the models are more complex than the triangular ones because the complexity is reflected in the shapes of the (non-flexible) heptagonal faces, rather than in the (flexible) vertices.

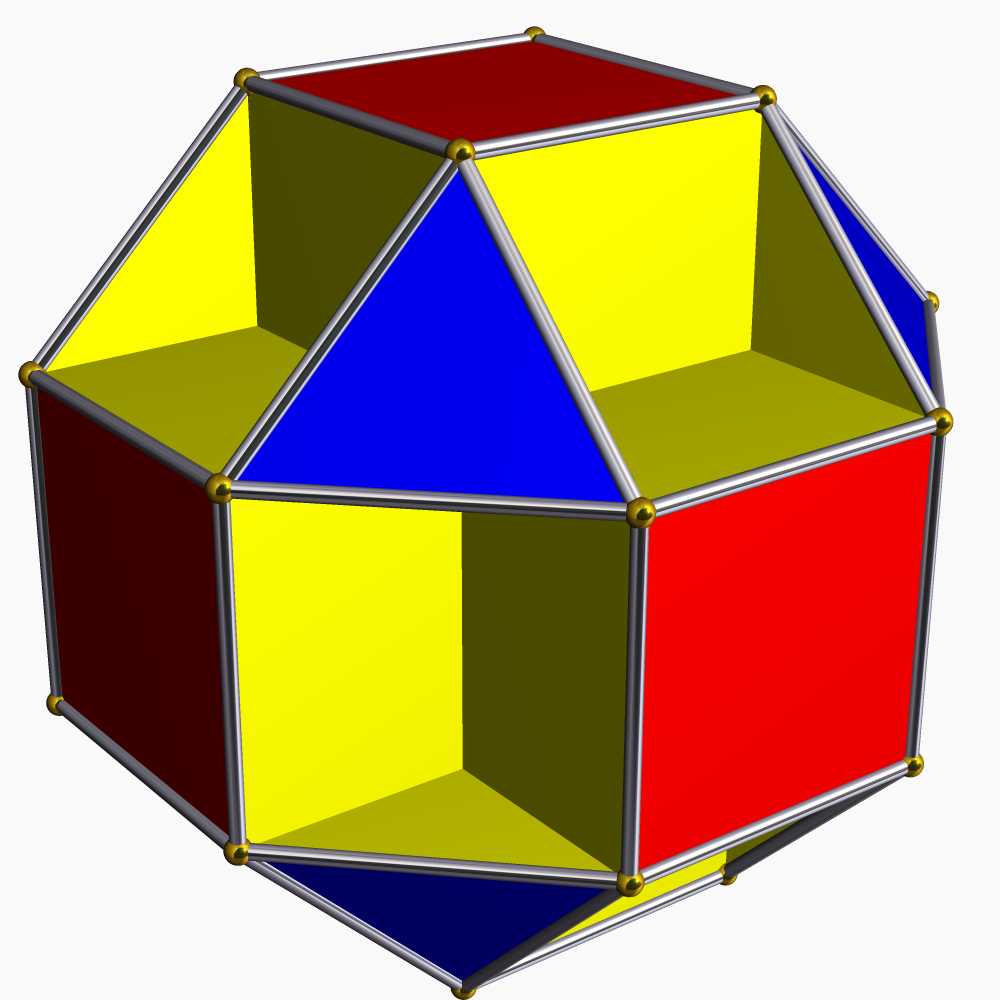
The small cubicuboctahedron is a polyhedral immersion of the tiling of the Klein quartic with octahedral symmetry.

Alternatively, the quartic can be modeled by a polyhedron with octahedral symmetry: Klein modeled the quartic by a shape with octahedral symmetries and with points at infinity (an "open polyhedron"), namely three hyperboloids meeting on orthogonal axes, while it can also be modeled as a closed polyhedron which must be immersed (have self-intersections), not embedded. Such polyhedra may have various convex hulls, including the truncated cube, the snub cube, or the rhombicuboctahedron, as in the small cubicuboctahedron at right. The small cubicuboctahedron immersion is obtained by joining some of the triangles (2 triangles form a square, 6 form an octagon), which can be visualized by coloring the triangles (the corresponding tiling is topologically but not geometrically the 3 4 | 4 tiling). This immersion can also be used to geometrically construct the Mathieu group M_{24} by adding to PSL(2,7) the permutation which interchanges opposite points of the bisecting lines of the squares and octagons.

== Dessin d'enfants ==
The dessin d'enfant on the Klein quartic associated with the quotient map by its automorphism group (with quotient the Riemann sphere) is precisely the 1-skeleton of the order-3 heptagonal tiling. That is, the quotient map is ramified over the points 0, 1728, and ∞; dividing by 1728 yields a Belyi function (ramified at 0, 1, and ∞), where the 56 vertices (black points in dessin) lie over 0, the midpoints of the 84 edges (white points in dessin) lie over 1, and the centers of the 24 heptagons lie over infinity. The resulting dessin is a "platonic" dessin, meaning edge-transitive and "clean" (each white point has valence 2).

== Related Riemann surfaces ==
The Klein quartic is related to various other Riemann surfaces.

Geometrically, it is the smallest Hurwitz surface (lowest genus); the next is the Macbeath surface (genus 7), and the following is the First Hurwitz triplet (3 surfaces of genus 14). More generally, it is the most symmetric surface of a given genus (being a Hurwitz surface); in this class, the Bolza surface is the most symmetric genus 2 surface, while Bring's surface is a highly symmetric genus 4 surface – see isometries of Riemann surfaces for further discussion.

Algebraically, the (affine) Klein quartic is the modular curve X(7) and the projective Klein quartic is its compactification, just as the dodecahedron (with a cusp in the center of each face) is the modular curve X(5); this explains the relevance for number theory.

More subtly, the (projective) Klein quartic is a Shimura curve (as are the Hurwitz surfaces of genus 7 and 14), and as such parametrizes principally polarized abelian varieties of dimension 6.

More exceptionally, the Klein quartic forms part of a "trinity" in the sense of Vladimir Arnold, which can also be described as a McKay correspondence. In this collection, the projective special linear groups PSL(2,5), PSL(2,7), and PSL(2,11) (orders 60, 168, 660) are analogous. Note that 4 × 5 × 6/2 = 60, 6 × 7 × 8/2 = 168, and 10 × 11 × 12/2 = 660. These correspond to icosahedral symmetry (genus 0), the symmetries of the Klein quartic (genus 3), and the buckyball surface (genus 70). These are further connected to many other exceptional phenomena, which is elaborated at "trinities".

== See also ==
- Bolza surface
- Bring's curve
- First Hurwitz triplet
- Grünbaum–Rigby configuration
- Hurwitz surface
- Macbeath surface
- Shimura curve

== Literature ==
- Klein, F. (1878). "Ueber die Transformation siebenter Ordnung der elliptischen Functionen" [On the order-seven transformation of elliptic functions]. Mathematische Annalen. 14 (3): 428–471. doi:10.1007/BF01677143. S2CID 121407539. Translated in Levy 1999.
- Elkies, N. (1998), "Shimura curve computations", Algorithmic number theory (Portland, OR, 1998), Lecture Notes in Computer Science, vol. 1423, Berlin: Springer, pp. 1–47, arXiv:math.NT/0005160, doi:10.1007/BFb0054850, ISBN 978-3-540-64657-0, MR 1726059, S2CID 18251612
- Levy, Silvio, ed. (1999), The Eightfold Way, Mathematical Sciences Research Institute Publications, vol. 35, Cambridge University Press, ISBN 978-0-521-66066-2, MR 1722410. Paperback edition, Cambridge University Press, 2001, ISBN 978-0-521-00419-0. Reviewed by: Michler, Ruth I. (31 July 2000). "The Eightfold Way: The Beauty of Klein's Quartic Curve". Mathematical Association of America. MAA reviews.
- Schulte, Egon; Wills, J. M. (1985-12-01), "A Polyhedral Realization of Felix Klein's Map {3, 7}_{8} on a Riemann Surface of Genus 3", J. London Math. Soc., s2-32 (3): 539–547, doi:10.1112/jlms/s2-32.3.539
- Richter, David A., How to Make the Mathieu Group M_{24}
- Schmutz, P. (1993). "Riemann surfaces with shortest geodesic of maximal length". GAFA. 3 (6): 564–631. doi:10.1007/BF01896258. S2CID 120508826.
- Scholl, P.; Schürmann, A.; Wills, J. M. (September 2002), "Polyhedral Models of Felix Klein's Group", The Mathematical Intelligencer, 24 (3): 37–42, doi:10.1007/BF03024730, S2CID 122330024, archived from the original on 2007-06-11
- Singerman, David; Syddall, Robert I. (2003), "The Riemann Surface of a Uniform Dessin", Beiträge zur Algebra und Geometrie, 44 (2): 413–430
