= Cusp neighborhood =

Neighborhood of a singularity of cusp type

In mathematics, a cusp neighborhood is defined as a set of points near a cusp singularity.

== Cusp neighborhood for a Riemann surface ==
The cusp neighborhood for a hyperbolic Riemann surface can be defined in terms of its Fuchsian model.

Suppose that the Fuchsian group G contains a parabolic element g. For example, the element t ∈ SL(2,Z) where

$$t(z)=\begin{pmatrix} 1 & 1 \\ 0 & 1 \end{pmatrix}:z = \frac{1\cdot z+1}{0 \cdot z + 1} = z+1$$

is a parabolic element. Note that all parabolic elements of SL(2,C) are conjugate to this element. That is, if g ∈ SL(2,Z) is parabolic, then $g=h^{-1}th$ for some h ∈ SL(2,Z).

The set

$$U=\{ z \in \mathbf{H} : \Im z > 1 \}$$

where H is the upper half-plane has

$$\gamma(U) \cap U = \emptyset$$

for any $\gamma \in G - \langle g \rangle$ where $\langle g \rangle$ is understood to mean the group generated by g. That is, γ acts properly discontinuously on U. Because of this, it can be seen that the projection of U onto H/G is thus

$$E = U/ \langle g \rangle$$.

Here, E is called the neighborhood of the cusp corresponding to g.

Note that the hyperbolic area of E is exactly 1, when computed using the canonical Poincaré metric. This is most easily seen by example: consider the intersection of U defined above with the fundamental domain

$$\left\{ z \in H: \left| z \right| > 1,\, \left| \,\mbox{Re}(z) \,\right| < \frac{1}{2} \right\}$$

of the modular group, as would be appropriate for the choice of T as the parabolic element. When integrated over the volume element

$$d\mu=\frac{dxdy}{y^2}$$

the result is trivially 1. Areas of all cusp neighborhoods are equal to this, by the invariance of the area under conjugation.

== See also ==
- Cusp form
