= Hurwitz surface =

Every Hurwitz surface has a triangulation as a quotient of the order-7 triangular tiling, with the automorphisms of the triangulation equaling the Riemannian and algebraic automorphisms of the surface.

In Riemann surface theory and hyperbolic geometry, a Hurwitz surface, named after Adolf Hurwitz, is a compact Riemann surface with precisely 84(g − 1) automorphisms, where g is the genus of the surface. This number is maximal by virtue of Hurwitz's theorem on automorphisms (Hurwitz 1893). They are also referred to as Hurwitz curves, interpreting them as complex algebraic curves (complex dimension 1 = real dimension 2).

The Fuchsian group of a Hurwitz surface is a finite index torsionfree normal subgroup of the (ordinary) (2,3,7) triangle group. The finite quotient group is precisely the automorphism group.

Automorphisms of complex algebraic curves are orientation-preserving automorphisms of the underlying real surface; if one allows orientation-reversing isometries, this yields a group twice as large, of order 168(g − 1), which is sometimes of interest.

A note on terminology – in this and other contexts, the "(2,3,7) triangle group" most often refers, not to the full triangle group Δ(2,3,7) (the Coxeter group with Schwarz triangle (2,3,7) or a realization as a hyperbolic reflection group), but rather to the ordinary triangle group (the von Dyck group) D(2,3,7) of orientation-preserving maps (the rotation group), which is index 2. The group of complex automorphisms is a quotient of the ordinary (orientation-preserving) triangle group, while the group of (possibly orientation-reversing) isometries is a quotient of the full triangle group.

== Classification by genus ==
Only finitely many Hurwitz surfaces occur with each genus. The function $h(g)$ mapping the genus to the number of Hurwitz surfaces with that genus is unbounded, even though most of its values are zero. The sum

$$\sum_{i=1}^{\infty}\frac{h(g)}{g^s}$$

converges for $s > 1/3$, implying in an approximate sense that the genus of the $n$th Hurwitz surface grows at least as a cubic function of $n$ (Larsen 2001).

The Hurwitz surface of least genus is the Klein quartic of genus 3, with automorphism group the projective special linear group PSL(2,7), of order 84(3 − 1) = 168 = 2^{3}·3·7, which is a simple group; (or order 336 if one allows orientation-reversing isometries). The next possible genus is 7, possessed by the Macbeath surface, with automorphism group PSL(2,8), which is the simple group of order 84(7 − 1) = 504 = 2^{3}·3^{2}·7; if one includes orientation-reversing isometries, the group is of order 1,008.

An interesting phenomenon occurs in the next possible genus, namely 14. Here there is a triple of distinct Riemann surfaces with the identical automorphism group (of order 84(14 − 1) = 1092 = 2^{2}·3·7·13). The explanation for this phenomenon is arithmetic. Namely, in the ring of integers of the appropriate number field, the rational prime 13 splits as a product of three distinct prime ideals. The principal congruence subgroups defined by the triplet of primes produce Fuchsian groups corresponding to the first Hurwitz triplet.

The sequence of allowable values for the genus of a Hurwitz surface begins

3, 7, 14, 17, 118, 129, 146, 385, 411, 474, 687, 769, 1009, 1025, 1459, 1537, 2091, ... (sequence A179982 in the OEIS)

== See also ==
- Hurwitz quaternion order
