= Non-Euclidean crystallographic group =

In mathematics, a non-Euclidean crystallographic group, NEC group or N.E.C. group is a discrete group of isometries of the hyperbolic plane. These symmetry groups correspond to the wallpaper groups in euclidean geometry. A NEC group which contains only orientation-preserving elements is called a Fuchsian group, and any non-Fuchsian NEC group has an index 2 Fuchsian subgroup of orientation-preserving elements.

The hyperbolic triangle groups are notable NEC groups. Others are listed in Orbifold notation.

== See also ==
- Non-Euclidean geometry
- Isometry group
- Fuchsian group
- Uniform tilings in hyperbolic plane
