= Smooth completion =

In algebraic geometry, the smooth completion (or smooth compactification) of a smooth affine algebraic curve X is a complete smooth algebraic curve which contains X as an open subset. Smooth completions exist and are unique over a perfect field.

== Examples ==
An affine form of a hyperelliptic curve may be presented as $y^2=P(x)$ where $(x, y)\in\mathbb{C}^2$ and P(x) has distinct roots and has degree at least 5. The Zariski closure of the affine curve in $\mathbb{C}\mathbb{P}^2$ is singular at the unique infinite point added. Nonetheless, the affine curve can be embedded in a unique compact Riemann surface called its smooth completion. The projection of the Riemann surface to $\mathbb{C}\mathbb{P}^1$ is 2-to-1 over the singular point at infinity if $P(x)$ has even degree, and 1-to-1 (but ramified) otherwise.

This smooth completion can also be obtained as follows. Project the affine curve to the affine line using the x-coordinate. Embed the affine line into the projective line, then take the normalization of the projective line in the function field of the affine curve.

== Applications ==
A smooth connected curve over an algebraically closed field is called hyperbolic if $2g-2+r>0$ where g is the genus of the smooth completion and r is the number of added points.

Over an algebraically closed field of characteristic 0, the fundamental group of X is free with $2g+r-1$ generators if r>0.

(Analogue of Dirichlet's unit theorem) Let X be a smooth connected curve over a finite field. Then the units of the ring of regular functions O(X) on X is a finitely generated abelian group of rank r -1.

== Construction ==
Suppose the base field is perfect. Any affine curve X is isomorphic to an open subset of an integral projective (hence complete) curve. Taking the normalization (or blowing up the singularities) of the projective curve then gives a smooth completion of X. Their points correspond to the discrete valuations of the function field that are trivial on the base field.

By construction, the smooth completion is a projective curve which contains the given curve as an everywhere dense open subset, and the added new points are smooth. Such a (projective) completion always exists and is unique.

If the base field is not perfect, a smooth completion of a smooth affine curve doesn't always exist. But the above process always produces a regular completion if we start with a regular affine curve (smooth varieties are regular, and the converse is true over perfect fields). A regular completion is unique and, by the valuative criterion of properness, any morphism from the affine curve to a complete algebraic variety extends uniquely to the regular completion.

== Generalization ==
If X is a separated algebraic variety, a theorem of Nagata says that X can be embedded as an open subset of a complete algebraic variety. If X is moreover smooth and the base field has characteristic 0, then by Hironaka's theorem X can even be embedded as an open subset of a complete smooth algebraic variety, with boundary a normal crossing divisor. If X is quasi-projective, the smooth completion can be chosen to be projective.

However, contrary to the one-dimensional case, there is no uniqueness of the smooth completion, nor is it canonical.

== See also ==
- Hyperelliptic curve
- Bolza surface

== Bibliography ==
- Griffiths, Phillip A. (1972). "Function theory of finite order on algebraic varieties. I(A)". Journal of Differential Geometry. 6 (3): 285–306. MR 0325999. Zbl 0269.14003.
- Hartshorne, Robin (1977). Algebraic geometry. Graduate Texts in Mathematics. Vol. 52. New York, Heidelberg: Springer-Verlag. ISBN 0387902449. (see chapter 4).
