= Triangle group =

Group realized geometrically by reflections across the sides of a triangle

In mathematics, a triangle group is a group that can be realized geometrically by sequences of reflections across the sides of a triangle. The triangle can be an ordinary Euclidean triangle, a triangle on the sphere, or a hyperbolic triangle. Each triangle group is the symmetry group of a tiling of the Euclidean plane, the sphere, or the hyperbolic plane by congruent triangles called Möbius triangles, each one a fundamental domain for the action.

== Definition ==
Let l, m, n be integers greater than or equal to 2. A triangle group Δ(l, m, n) is a group of motions of the Euclidean plane, the two-dimensional sphere, the real projective plane, or the hyperbolic plane generated by the reflections in the sides of a triangle with angles π/l, π/m and π/n (measured in radians). The product of the reflections in two adjacent sides is a rotation by the angle which is twice the angle between those sides, 2π/l, 2π/m and 2π/n. Therefore, if the generating reflections are labeled a, b, c and the angles between them in the cyclic order are as given above, then the following relations hold:

1. $a^{2}=b^{2}=c^{2}=1$ and
2. $(ab)^{l}=(bc)^{m}=(ca)^{n}=1.$

It is a theorem that all other relations between a, b, c are consequences of these relations and that Δ(l, m, n) is a discrete group of motions of the corresponding space. Thus a triangle group is a reflection group that admits a group presentation

$$\Delta(l,m,n) = \langle a,b,c \mid a^{2} =  b^{2} = c^{2} = (ab)^{l} = (bc)^{m} = (ca)^{n} =  1 \rangle.$$

An abstract group with this presentation is a Coxeter group with three generators.

== Classification ==
Given any natural numbers l, m, n > 1 exactly one of the classical two-dimensional geometries (Euclidean, spherical, or hyperbolic) admits a triangle with the angles (π/l, π/m, π/n), and the space is tiled by reflections of the triangle. The sum of the angles of the triangle determines the type of the geometry by the Gauss–Bonnet theorem: it is Euclidean if the angle sum is exactly π, spherical if it exceeds π and hyperbolic if it is strictly smaller than π. Moreover, any two triangles with the given angles are congruent. Each triangle group determines a tiling, which is conventionally colored in two colors, so that any two adjacent tiles have opposite colors.

In terms of the numbers l, m, n > 1 there are the following possibilities.

=== The Euclidean case ===
$$\frac{1}{l}+\frac{1}{m}+\frac{1}{n}=1.$$

The triangle group is the infinite symmetry group of a certain tessellation (or tiling) of the Euclidean plane by triangles whose angles add up to π (or 180°). Up to permutations, the triple (l, m, n) is one of the triples (2,3,6), (2,4,4), (3,3,3). The corresponding triangle groups are instances of wallpaper groups.

(2,3,6)	(2,4,4)	(3,3,3)
bisected hexagonal tiling	tetrakis square tiling	triangular tiling
More detailed diagrams, labeling the vertices and showing how reflection operates:

=== The spherical case ===
$$\frac{1}{l}+\frac{1}{m}+\frac{1}{n}>1.$$

The triangle group is the finite symmetry group of a tiling of a unit sphere by spherical triangles, or Möbius triangles, whose angles add up to a number greater than π. Up to permutations, the triple (l,m,n) has the form (2,3,3), (2,3,4), (2,3,5), or (2,2,n), n > 1. Spherical triangle groups can be identified with the symmetry groups of regular polyhedra in the three-dimensional Euclidean space: Δ(2,3,3) corresponds to the tetrahedron, Δ(2,3,4) to both the cube and the octahedron (which have the same symmetry group), Δ(2,3,5) to both the dodecahedron and the icosahedron. The groups Δ(2,2,n), n > 1 of dihedral symmetry can be interpreted as the symmetry groups of the family of dihedra, which are degenerate solids formed by two identical regular n-gons joined together, or dually hosohedra, which are formed by joining n digons together at two vertices.

The spherical tiling corresponding to a regular polyhedron is obtained by forming the barycentric subdivision of the polyhedron and projecting the resulting points and lines onto the circumscribed sphere. In the case of the tetrahedron, there are four faces and each face is an equilateral triangle that is subdivided into 6 smaller pieces by the medians intersecting in the center. The resulting tesselation has 4 × 6 = 24 spherical triangles (it is the spherical disdyakis cube).

These groups are finite, which corresponds to the compactness of the sphere – areas of discs in the sphere initially grow in terms of radius, but eventually cover the entire sphere.

The triangular tilings are depicted below:

(2,2,2)	(2,2,3)	(2,2,4)	(2,2,5)	(2,2,6)	(2,2,n)
(2,3,3)		(2,3,4)		(2,3,5)	

Spherical tilings corresponding to the octahedron and the icosahedron and dihedral spherical tilings with even n are centrally symmetric. Hence each of them determines a tiling of the real projective plane, an elliptic tiling. Its symmetry group is the quotient of the spherical triangle group by the reflection through the origin (−I), which is a central element of order 2. Since the projective plane is a model of elliptic geometry, such groups are called elliptic triangle groups.

=== The hyperbolic case ===
$$\frac{1}{l}+\frac{1}{m}+\frac{1}{n}<1.$$

The triangle group is the infinite symmetry group of a tiling of the hyperbolic plane by hyperbolic triangles whose angles add up to a number less than π. All triples not already listed represent tilings of the hyperbolic plane. For example, the triple (2,3,7) produces the (2,3,7) triangle group. There are infinitely many such groups; the tilings associated with some small values:

==== Hyperbolic plane ====
Poincaré disk model of fundamental domain triangles
Example right triangles (2 p q)
(2 3 7)	(2 3 8)	(2 3 9)	(2 3 ∞)	
(2 4 5)	(2 4 6)	(2 4 7)	(2 4 8)	(2 4 ∞)
(2 5 5)	(2 5 6)	(2 5 7)	(2 6 6)	(2 ∞ ∞)
Example general triangles (p q r)
(3 3 4)	(3 3 5)	(3 3 6)	(3 3 7)	(3 3 ∞)
(3 4 4)	(3 6 6)	(3 ∞ ∞)	(6 6 6)	(∞ ∞ ∞)

Hyperbolic triangle groups are examples of non-Euclidean crystallographic group and have been generalized in the theory of Gromov hyperbolic groups.

== Von Dyck groups ==
Denote by D(l,m,n) the subgroup of index 2 in Δ(l,m,n) generated by words of even length in the generators. Such subgroups are sometimes referred to as "ordinary" triangle groups or von Dyck groups, after Walther von Dyck. For spherical, Euclidean, and hyperbolic triangles, these correspond to the elements of the group that preserve the orientation of the triangle – the group of rotations. For projective (elliptic) triangles, they cannot be so interpreted, as the projective plane is non-orientable, so there is no notion of "orientation-preserving". The reflections are however locally orientation-reversing (and every manifold is locally orientable, because locally Euclidean): they fix a line and at each point in the line are a reflection across the line.

The group D(l,m,n) is defined by the following presentation:

$$D(l,m,n)=\langle x,y \mid x^l,y^m,(xy)^n\rangle.$$

In terms of the generators above, these are x = ab, y = ca, yx = cb. Geometrically, the three elements x, y, xy correspond to rotations by 2π/l, 2π/m and 2π/n about the three vertices of the triangle.

Note that D(l,m,n) ≅ D(m,l,n) ≅ D(n,m,l), so D(l,m,n) is independent of the order of the l,m,n.

A hyperbolic von Dyck group is a Fuchsian group, a discrete group consisting of orientation-preserving isometries of the hyperbolic plane.

== Overlapping tilings ==
Triangle groups preserve a tiling by triangles, namely a fundamental domain for the action (the triangle defined by the lines of reflection), called a Möbius triangle, and are given by a triple of integers, (l,m,n), – integers correspond to (2l,2m,2n) triangles coming together at a vertex. There are also tilings by overlapping triangles, which correspond to Schwarz triangles with rational numbers (l/a,m/b,n/c), where the denominators are coprime to the numerators. This corresponds to edges meeting at angles of aπ/l (resp.), which corresponds to a rotation of 2aπ/l (resp.), which has order l and is thus identical as an abstract group element, but distinct when represented by a reflection.

For example, the Schwarz triangle (2 3 3) yields a density 1 tiling of the sphere, while the triangle (2 3/2 3) yields a density 3 tiling of the sphere, but with the same abstract group. These symmetries of overlapping tilings are not considered triangle groups.

== History ==
Triangle groups date at least to the presentation of the icosahedral group as the (rotational) (2,3,5) triangle group by William Rowan Hamilton in 1856, in his paper on icosian calculus.

== Applications ==
External videos
- Warped modular tiling – visualization of the map (2,3,∞) → (2,3,7) by morphing the associated tilings.

Triangle groups arise in arithmetic geometry. The modular group is generated by two elements, S and T, subject to the relations S² = (ST)³ = 1 (no relation on T), is the rotational triangle group (2,3,∞) and maps onto all triangle groups (2,3,n) by adding the relation T^{n} = 1. More generally, the Hecke group H_{q} is generated by two elements, S and T, subject to the relations S^{2} = (ST)^{q} = 1 (no relation on T), is the rotational triangle group (2,q,∞), and maps onto all triangle groups (2,q,n) by adding the relation T^{n} = 1 the modular group is the Hecke group H_{3}. In Grothendieck's theory of dessins d'enfants, a Belyi function gives rise to a tessellation of a Riemann surface by reflection domains of a triangle group.

All 26 sporadic groups are quotients of triangle groups, of which 12 are Hurwitz groups (quotients of the (2,3,7) group).

== See also ==
- Geometric group theory
- Schwarz triangle
- The Schwarz triangle map is a map of triangles to the upper half-plane.
