= Hurwitz quaternion order =

Concept in mathematics

The Hurwitz quaternion order is a specific order in a quaternion algebra over a suitable number field. The order is of particular importance in Riemann surface theory, in connection with surfaces with maximal symmetry, namely the Hurwitz surfaces. The Hurwitz quaternion order was studied in 1967 by Goro Shimura, but first explicitly described by Noam Elkies in 1998. For an alternative use of the term, see Hurwitz quaternion (both usages are current in the literature).

== Definition ==
Let $K$ be the maximal real subfield of $\mathbb{Q}$$(\rho)$ where $\rho$ is a 7th-primitive root of unity. The ring of integers of $K$ is $\mathbb{Z}[\eta]$, where the element $\eta=\rho+ \bar\rho$ can be identified with the positive real $2\cos(\tfrac{2\pi}{7})$. Let $D$ be the quaternion algebra, or symbol algebra

$$D:=\,(\eta,\eta)_{K},$$

so that $i^2=j^2=\eta$ and $ij=-ji$ in $D.$ Also let $\tau=1+\eta+\eta^2$ and $j'=\tfrac{1}{2}(1+\eta i + \tau j)$. Let

$$\mathcal{Q}_{\mathrm{Hur}}=\mathbb{Z}[\eta][i,j,j'].$$

Then $\mathcal{Q}_{\mathrm{Hur}}$ is a maximal order of $D$, described explicitly by Noam Elkies.

== Module structure ==
The order $Q_{\mathrm{Hur}}$ is also generated by elements

$$g_2= \tfrac{1}{\eta}ij$$

and

$$g_3=\tfrac{1}{2}(1+(\eta^2-2)j+(3-\eta^2)ij).$$

In fact, the order is a free $\mathbb Z[\eta]$-module over the basis $\,1,g_2,g_3, g_2g_3$. Here the generators satisfy the relations

$$g_2^2=g_3^3= (g_2g_3)^7=-1,$$

which descend to the appropriate relations in the (2,3,7) triangle group, after quotienting by the center.

== Principal congruence subgroups ==
The principal congruence subgroup defined by an ideal $I \subset \mathbb{Z}[\eta]$ is by definition the group

$\mathcal{Q}^1_{\mathrm{Hur}}(I) = \{x \in \mathcal{Q}_{\mathrm{Hur}}^1 : x \equiv 1 ($mod $I\mathcal{Q}_{\mathrm{Hur}})\},$

namely, the group of elements of reduced norm 1 in $\mathcal{Q}_{\mathrm{Hur}}$ equivalent to 1 modulo the ideal $I\mathcal{Q}_{\mathrm{Hur}}$. The corresponding Fuchsian group is obtained as the image of the principal congruence subgroup under a representation to PSL(2,R).

== Application ==
The order was used by Katz, Schaps, and Vishne to construct a family of Hurwitz surfaces satisfying an asymptotic lower bound for the systole: $sys > \frac{4}{3}\log g$ where g is the genus, improving an earlier result of Peter Buser and Peter Sarnak; see systoles of surfaces.

== See also ==
- (2,3,7) triangle group
- Klein quartic
- Macbeath surface
- First Hurwitz triplet
