= Upper half-plane =

Complex numbers with non-negative imaginary part

In mathematics, the upper half-plane, $\mathcal H,$ is the set of points $(x,y)$ in the Cartesian plane with $y > 0.$ The lower half-plane is the set of points $(x,y)$ with $y < 0$ instead. Arbitrarily oriented half-planes can be obtained via a planar rotation. Half-planes are an example of two-dimensional half-space. A half-plane can be split in two quadrants.

== Affine geometry ==
The affine transformations of the upper half-plane include

1. shifts $(x,y)\mapsto (x+c,y)$, $c\in\mathbb{R}$, and
2. dilations $(x,y)\mapsto (\lambda x,\lambda y)$, $\lambda > 0.$

Proposition: Let $A$ and $B$ be semicircles in the upper half-plane with centers on the boundary. Then there is an affine mapping that takes $A$ to $B$.

Proof: First shift the center of $A$ to $(0,0).$ Then take $\lambda=(\text{diameter of}\ B)/(\text{diameter of}\ A)$

and dilate. Then shift $(0,0)$ to the center of $B.$

== Inversive geometry ==
Definition: $\mathcal{Z} := \left\{\left( \cos^2\theta,\tfrac12 \sin 2\theta \right) \mid 0 < \theta < \pi \right\}$.

$\mathcal Z$ can be recognized as the circle of radius $\tfrac12$ centered at $\bigl(\tfrac12,0\bigr),$ and as the polar plot of $\rho(\theta) = \cos \theta.$

Proposition: $(0,0),$ $\rho(\theta)$ in $\mathcal{Z},$ and $(1,\tan \theta)$ are collinear points.

In fact, $\mathcal{Z}$ is the inversion of the line $\bigl\{(1, y) \mid y > 0 \bigr\}$ in the unit circle. Indeed, the diagonal from $(0,0)$ to $(1, \tan \theta)$ has squared length $1 + \tan^2 \theta = \sec^2 \theta$, so that $\rho(\theta) = \cos \theta$ is the reciprocal of that length.

== Metric geometry ==
The distance between any two points $p$ and $q$ in the upper half-plane can be consistently defined as follows: The perpendicular bisector of the segment from $p$ to $q$ either intersects the boundary or is parallel to it. In the latter case $p$ and $q$ lie on a ray perpendicular to the boundary and logarithmic measure can be used to define a distance that is invariant under dilation. In the former case $p$ and $q$ lie on a circle centered at the intersection of their perpendicular bisector and the boundary. By the above proposition this circle can be moved by affine motion to $\mathcal Z.$ Distances on $\mathcal Z$ can be defined using the correspondence with points on $\bigl\{(1, y) \mid y > 0 \bigr\}$ and logarithmic measure on this ray. In consequence, the upper half-plane becomes a metric space. The generic name of this metric space is the hyperbolic plane. In terms of the models of hyperbolic geometry, this model is frequently designated the Poincaré half-plane model.

== Complex plane ==
Mathematicians sometimes identify the Cartesian plane with the complex plane, and then the upper half-plane corresponds to the set of complex numbers with positive imaginary part:

$$\mathcal{H} := \{x + iy \mid y > 0;\ x, y \in \mathbb{R} \} .$$

The term arises from a common visualization of the complex number $x+iy$ as the point $(x,y)$ in the plane endowed with Cartesian coordinates. When the $y$ axis is oriented vertically, the "upper half-plane" corresponds to the region above the $x$ axis and thus complex numbers for which $y > 0$.

It is the domain of many functions of interest in complex analysis, especially modular forms. The lower half-plane, defined by $y < 0$ is equally good, but less used by convention. The open unit disk $\mathcal D$ (the set of all complex numbers of absolute value less than one) is equivalent by a conformal mapping to $\mathcal H$ (see "Poincaré metric"), meaning that it is usually possible to pass between $\mathcal H$ and $\mathcal D.$

It also plays an important role in hyperbolic geometry, where the Poincaré half-plane model provides a way of examining hyperbolic motions. The Poincaré metric provides a hyperbolic metric on the space.

The uniformization theorem for surfaces states that the upper half-plane is the universal covering space of surfaces with constant negative Gaussian curvature.

The closed upper half-plane is the union of the upper half-plane and the real axis. It is the closure of the upper half-plane.

== Generalizations ==
One natural generalization in differential geometry is hyperbolic $n$-space $\mathcal H^n,$ the maximally symmetric, simply connected, $n$-dimensional Riemannian manifold with constant sectional curvature $-1$. In this terminology, the upper half-plane is $\mathcal H^2$ since it has real dimension $2.$

In number theory, the theory of Hilbert modular forms is concerned with the study of certain functions on the direct product $\mathcal H^n$ of $n$ copies of the upper half-plane. Yet another space interesting to number theorists is the Siegel upper half-space $\mathcal H_n,$ which is the domain of Siegel modular forms.

== See also ==
- Cusp neighborhood
- Extended complex upper-half plane
- Fuchsian group
- Fundamental domain
- Half-space
- Kleinian group
- Modular group
- Moduli stack of elliptic curves
- Riemann surface
- Schwarz–Ahlfors–Pick theorem
