= Fuchsian group =

Discrete subgroup of the real projective special linear group of dimension 2

PSL(2, Z), the modular group, a Fuchsian group of the first kind, acting on the upper half-plane model. Every rational point is a parabolic fixed point, and the limit set is the real projective line.

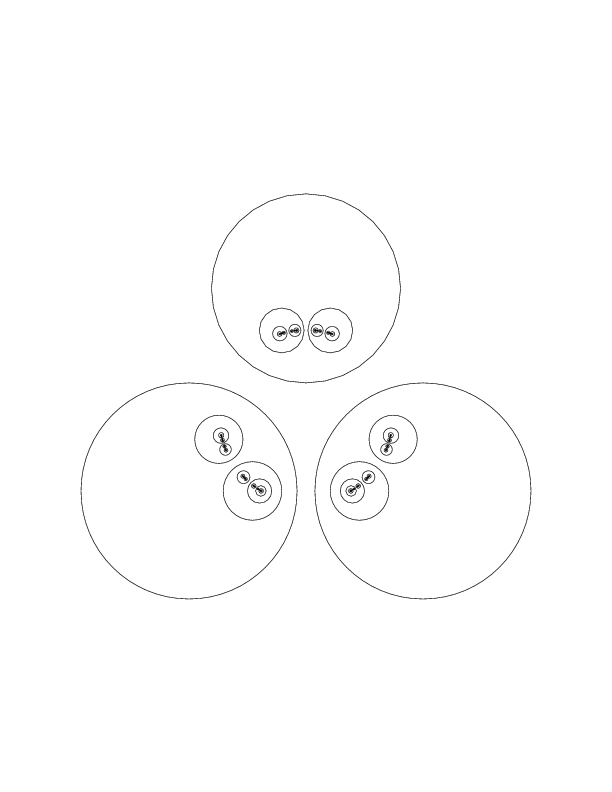
A Fuchsian group of the second kind, a Schottky group, whose limit set is a Cantor set.

In mathematics, a Fuchsian group is a discrete subgroup of PSL(2, R). The group PSL(2, R) can be regarded equivalently as a group of orientation-preserving isometries of the hyperbolic plane, or conformal transformations of the unit disc, or conformal transformations of the upper half plane, so a Fuchsian group can be regarded as a group acting on any of these spaces. There are some variations of the definition: sometimes the Fuchsian group is assumed to be finitely generated, sometimes it is allowed to be a subgroup of PGL(2, R) (so that it contains orientation-reversing elements), and sometimes it is allowed to be a Kleinian group (a discrete subgroup of PSL(2, C)) which is conjugate to a subgroup of PSL(2, R).

Fuchsian groups are used to create Fuchsian models of Riemann surfaces. In this case, the group may be called the Fuchsian group of the surface. In some sense, Fuchsian groups do for non-Euclidean geometry what crystallographic groups do for Euclidean geometry. Some Escher graphics are based on them (for the disc model of hyperbolic geometry).

General Fuchsian groups were first studied by Henri Poincaré (1882), who was motivated by the paper (Fuchs 1880), and therefore named them after Lazarus Fuchs.

== Fuchsian groups on the upper half-plane ==
Let $H=\{z\in\mathbb{C}|\operatorname{Im}{z}>0\}$ be the upper half-plane. Then $H$ is a model of the hyperbolic plane when endowed with the metric

$$ds=\frac{1}{y}\sqrt{dx^2+dy^2}.$$

The group PSL(2, R) acts on $H$ by linear fractional transformations (also known as Möbius transformations):

$$\begin{pmatrix} a & b \\ c & d \end{pmatrix}\cdot z = \frac{az + b}{cz + d}.$$

This action is faithful, and in fact PSL(2, R) is isomorphic to the group of all orientation-preserving isometries of $H$.

A Fuchsian group $\Gamma$ may be defined to be a subgroup of PSL(2, R), which acts discontinuously on $H$. That is,

- For every $z$ in $H$, the orbit $\Gamma z =\{\gamma z:\gamma\in\Gamma\}$ has no accumulation point in $H$.

An equivalent definition for $\Gamma$ to be Fuchsian is that $\Gamma$ be a discrete group, which means that:

- Every sequence $\gamma_n$ of elements of $\Gamma$ converging to the identity in the usual topology of point-wise convergence is eventually constant, i.e. there exists an integer $\mathbb{N}$ such that for all $n>\mathbb{N}$, $\gamma_n=I$, where $I$ is the identity matrix.

Although discontinuity and discreteness are equivalent in this case, this is not generally true for the case of an arbitrary group of conformal homeomorphisms acting on the full Riemann sphere (as opposed to $H$). Indeed, the Fuchsian group PSL(2, Z) is discrete but has accumulation points on the real number line $\operatorname{Im}z=0$: elements of PSL(2, Z) will carry $z=0$ to every rational number, and the rationals Q are dense in R.

== General definition ==
A linear fractional transformation defined by a matrix from PSL(2, C) will preserve the Riemann sphere P^{1}(C) = C ∪ ∞, but will send the upper-half plane H to some open disk Δ. Conjugating by such a transformation will send a discrete subgroup of PSL(2, R) to a discrete subgroup of PSL(2, C) preserving Δ.

This motivates the following definition of a Fuchsian group. Let Γ ⊂ PSL(2, C) act invariantly on a proper, open disk Δ ⊂ C ∪ ∞, that is, Γ(Δ) = Δ. Then Γ is Fuchsian if and only if any of the following three equivalent properties hold:

1. Γ is a discrete group (with respect to the standard topology on PSL(2, C)).
2. Γ acts properly discontinuously at each point z ∈ Δ.
3. The set Δ is a subset of the region of discontinuity Ω(Γ) of Γ.

That is, any one of these three can serve as a definition of a Fuchsian group, the others following as theorems. The notion of an invariant proper subset Δ is important; the so-called Picard group PSL(2, Z[i]) is discrete but does not preserve any disk in the Riemann sphere. Indeed, even the modular group PSL(2, Z), which is a Fuchsian group, does not act discontinuously on the real number line; it has accumulation points at the rational numbers. Similarly, the idea that Δ is a proper subset of the region of discontinuity is important; when it is not, the subgroup is called a Kleinian group.

It is most usual to take the invariant domain Δ to be either the open unit disk or the upper half-plane.

== Limit sets ==
Because of the discrete action, the orbit Γz of a point z in the upper half-plane under the action of Γ has no accumulation points in the upper half-plane. There may, however, be limit points on the real axis. Let Λ(Γ) be the limit set of Γ, that is, the set of limit points of Γz for z ∈ H. Then Λ(Γ) ⊆ R ∪ ∞. The limit set may be empty, or may contain one or two points, or may contain an infinite number. In the latter case, there are two types:

A Fuchsian group of the first type is a group for which the limit set is the closed real line R ∪ ∞. This happens if the quotient space H/Γ has finite volume, but there are Fuchsian groups of the first kind of infinite covolume.

Otherwise, a Fuchsian group is said to be of the second type. Equivalently, this is a group for which the limit set is a perfect set that is nowhere dense on R ∪ ∞. Since it is nowhere dense, this implies that any limit point is arbitrarily close to an open set that is not in the limit set. In other words, the limit set is a Cantor set.

The type of a Fuchsian group need not be the same as its type when considered as a Kleinian group: in fact, all Fuchsian groups are Kleinian groups of type 2, as their limit sets (as Kleinian groups) are proper subsets of the Riemann sphere, contained in some circle.

== Examples ==
An example of a Fuchsian group is the modular group, PSL(2, Z). This is the subgroup of PSL(2, R) consisting of linear fractional transformations

$$\begin{pmatrix} a & b \\ c & d \end{pmatrix}\cdot z = \frac{az + b}{cz + d}$$

where a, b, c, d are integers. The quotient space H/PSL(2, Z) is the moduli space of elliptic curves.

Other Fuchsian groups include the groups Γ(n) for each integer n > 0. Here Γ(n) consists of linear fractional transformations of the above form where the entries of the matrix

$$\begin{pmatrix} a & b \\ c & d \end{pmatrix}$$

are congruent to those of the identity matrix modulo n.

A co-compact example is the (ordinary, rotational) (2,3,7) triangle group, containing the Fuchsian groups of the Klein quartic and of the Macbeath surface, as well as other Hurwitz groups. More generally, any hyperbolic von Dyck group (the index 2 subgroup of a triangle group, corresponding to orientation-preserving isometries) is a Fuchsian group.

All these are Fuchsian groups of the first kind.

- All hyperbolic and parabolic cyclic subgroups of PSL(2, R) are Fuchsian.
- Any elliptic cyclic subgroup is Fuchsian if and only if it is finite.
- Every abelian Fuchsian group is cyclic.
- No Fuchsian group is isomorphic to Z × Z.
- Let Γ be a non-abelian Fuchsian group. Then the normalizer of Γ in PSL(2, R) is Fuchsian.

== Metric properties ==
If h is a hyperbolic element, the translation length L of its action in the upper half-plane is related to the trace of h as a 2×2 matrix by the relation

$$|\mathrm{tr}\; h| = 2\cosh \frac{L}{2}.$$

A similar relation holds for the systole of the corresponding Riemann surface, if the Fuchsian group is torsion-free and co-compact.

== See also ==
- Quasi-Fuchsian group
- Non-Euclidean crystallographic group
- Schottky group
