= Order (ring theory) =

In mathematics, certain subsets of some fields are called orders. The set of integers is an order in the rational numbers (the only one). In an algebraic number field $K$, an order is a ring of algebraic integers whose field of fractions is $K$, and the maximal order, often denoted $\mathcal O_K$, is the ring of all algebraic integers in $K$. In a non-Archimedean local field $K$, an order is a subring which is generated by finitely many elements of non-negative valuation. In that case, the maximal order, denoted $\mathcal O_K$, is the valuation ring formed by all elements of non-negative valuation.

Giving the same name to such seemingly different notions is motivated by the local–global principle that relates properties of a number field with properties of all its local fields.

== Definitions ==
The definition of an order is somewhat context-dependent. The simplest definition is in an algebraic number field $F$, where an order $R$ is a subring of $F$ that is a finitely-generated $\mathbb Z$-module, which contains a rational basis of $F$, i.e., such that $\mathbb QR = F.$

On the other hand, if $F$ is a non-archimedean local field, an order is a compact-open subring $R$ of $F$. The maximal order in this case is the valuation ring of the field.

More generally, which includes both of these special cases, if $R$ an integral domain with fraction field $K$, an $R$-order in a finite-dimensional $K$-algebra $A$ is a subring $\mathcal{O}$ of $A$ which is a full $R$-lattice; i.e. is a finite $R$-module with the property that $\mathcal{O}\otimes_RK=A$.

When $A$ is not a commutative ring, the idea of order is still important, but the phenomena are different. For example, the Hurwitz quaternions form a maximal order in the quaternions with rational co-ordinates; they are not the quaternions with integer coordinates in the most obvious sense. Maximal orders exist in general, but need not be unique: there is in general no largest order, but a number of maximal orders. An important class of examples is that of integral group rings.

== Examples ==
Some examples of orders are:

- If $A$ is the matrix ring $M_n(K)$ over $K$, then the matrix ring $M_n(R)$ over $R$ is an $R$-order in $A$
- If $R$ is an integral domain and $L$ a finite separable extension of $K$, then the integral closure $S$ of $R$ in $L$ is an $R$-order in $L$.
- If $a$ in $A$ is an integral element over $R$, then the polynomial ring $R[a]$ is an $R$-order in the algebra $K[a]$
- If $A$ is the group ring $K[G]$ of a finite group $G$, then $R[G]$ is an $R$-order on $K[G]$

A fundamental property of $R$-orders is that every element of an $R$-order is integral over $R$.

If the integral closure $S$ of $R$ in $A$ is an $R$-order then the integrality of every element of every $R$-order shows that $S$ must be the unique maximal $R$-order in $A$. However $S$ need not always be an $R$-order: indeed $S$ need not even be a ring, and even if $S$ is a ring (for example, when $A$ is commutative) then $S$ need not be an $R$-lattice.

== Algebraic number theory ==
The leading example is the case where $A$ is a number field $K$ and $\mathcal{O}$ is its ring of integers. In algebraic number theory there are examples for any $K$ other than the rational field of proper subrings of the ring of integers that are also orders. For example, in the field extension $A=\mathbb{Q}(i)$ of Gaussian rationals over $\mathbb{Q}$, the integral closure of $\mathbb{Z}$ is the ring of Gaussian integers $\mathbb{Z}[i]$ and so this is the unique maximal $\mathbb{Z}$-order: all other orders in $A$ are contained in it. For example, we can take the subring of complex numbers of the form $a+2bi$, with $a$ and $b$ integers.

The maximal order question can be examined at a local field level. This technique is applied in algebraic number theory and modular representation theory.

== See also ==
- Hurwitz quaternion order – An example of ring order
