= MacBeath surface =

In Riemann surface theory and hyperbolic geometry, the MacBeath surface, also called MacBeath curve or the Fricke–MacBeath surface curve, is the genus-7 Hurwitz surface. It is named for Murray MacBeath.

The automorphism group of the MacBeath surface is the simple group PSL(2,8), consisting of 504 symmetries.

== Triangle group construction ==
The surface's Fuchsian group can be constructed as the principal congruence subgroup of the (2,3,7) triangle group in a suitable tower of principal congruence subgroups. Here the choices of quaternion algebra and Hurwitz quaternion order are described at the triangle group page. Choosing the ideal $\langle 2 \rangle$ in the ring of integers, the corresponding principal congruence subgroup defines this surface of genus 7. Its systole is about 5.796, and the number of systolic loops is 126 according to R. Vogeler's calculations.

It is possible to realize the resulting triangulated surface as a non-convex polyhedron without self-intersections.

== Historical note ==
This surface was originally discovered by Robert Fricke (1899), but named after Alexander Murray Macbeath due to his later independent rediscovery of the same curve. Elkies writes that the equivalence between the curves studied by Fricke and Macbeath "may first have been observed by Serre in a 24.vii.1990 letter to Abhyankar". In a later survey article Macbeath attributes the result to Fricke.

== See also ==
- Klein quartic
- First Hurwitz triplet
