= Small ditrigonal icosidodecahedron =

Polyhedron with 32 faces

Small ditrigonal icosidodecahedron
Type	Uniform star polyhedron
Elements	F = 32, E = 60; V = 20 (χ = −8)
Faces by sides	20{3}+12{5/2}
Coxeter diagram	
Wythoff symbol	3 | 5/2 3
Symmetry group	I_{h}, [5,3], *532
Index references	U_{30}, C_{39}, W_{70}
Dual polyhedron	Small triambic icosahedron
Vertex figure	(3.5/2)^{3}
Bowers acronym	Sidtid

3D model of a small ditrigonal icosidodecahedron

In geometry, the small ditrigonal icosidodecahedron (or small ditrigonary icosidodecahedron) is a nonconvex uniform polyhedron, indexed as U_{30}. It has 32 faces (20 triangles and 12 pentagrams), 60 edges, and 20 vertices. It has extended Schläfli symbol a{5,3}, as an altered dodecahedron, and Coxeter diagram or.

It is constructed from Schwarz triangle (3 3 5/2) with Wythoff symbol 3 | 5/2 3. Its hexagonal vertex figure alternates equilateral triangle and pentagram faces.

== Related polyhedra ==
Its convex hull is a regular dodecahedron. It additionally shares its edge arrangement with the great ditrigonal icosidodecahedron (having the triangular faces in common), the ditrigonal dodecadodecahedron (having the pentagrammic faces in common), and the regular compound of five cubes. As a simple polyhedron, it is also a hexakis truncated icosahedron where the triangles touching the pentagons are made coplanar, making the others concave.

a{5,3}	a{5/2,3}	b{5,5/2}
=	=	=
Small ditrigonal icosidodecahedron	Great ditrigonal icosidodecahedron	Ditrigonal dodecadodecahedron
Dodecahedron (convex hull)	Compound of five cubes	Spherical compound of 5 cubes

== See also ==
- List of uniform polyhedra
