= Ditrigonal dodecadodecahedron =

Polyhedron with 24 faces

Ditrigonal dodecadodecahedron
Type	Uniform star polyhedron
Elements	F = 24, E = 60; V = 20 (χ = −16)
Faces by sides	12{5}+12{5/2}
Coxeter diagram	
Wythoff symbol	3 | 5/3 5; 3/2 | 5 5/2; 3/2 | 5/3 5/4; 3 | 5/2 5/4
Symmetry group	I_{h}, [5,3], *532
Index references	U_{41}, C_{53}, W_{80}
Dual polyhedron	Medial triambic icosahedron
Vertex figure	(5.5/3)^{3}
Bowers acronym	Ditdid

3D model of a ditrigonal dodecadodecahedron

In geometry, the ditrigonal dodecadodecahedron (or ditrigonary dodecadodecahedron) is a nonconvex uniform polyhedron, indexed as U_{41}. It has 24 faces (12 pentagons and 12 pentagrams), 60 edges, and 20 vertices. It has extended Schläfli symbol b{5,5/2}, as a blended great dodecahedron, and Coxeter diagram. It has 4 Schwarz triangle equivalent constructions, for example Wythoff symbol 3 | 5/3 5, and Coxeter diagram .

== Related polyhedra ==
Its convex hull is a regular dodecahedron. It additionally shares its edge arrangement with the small ditrigonal icosidodecahedron (having the pentagrammic faces in common), the great ditrigonal icosidodecahedron (having the pentagonal faces in common), and the regular compound of five cubes.

a{5,3}	a{5/2,3}	b{5,5/2}
=	=	=
Small ditrigonal icosidodecahedron	Great ditrigonal icosidodecahedron	Ditrigonal dodecadodecahedron
Dodecahedron (convex hull)	Compound of five cubes	

Furthermore, it may be viewed as a facetted dodecahedron: the pentagrammic faces are inscribed in the dodecahedron's pentagons. Its dual, the medial triambic icosahedron, is a stellation of the icosahedron.

It is topologically equivalent to a quotient space of the hyperbolic order-6 pentagonal tiling, by distorting the pentagrams back into regular pentagons. As such, it is a regular polyhedron of index two:

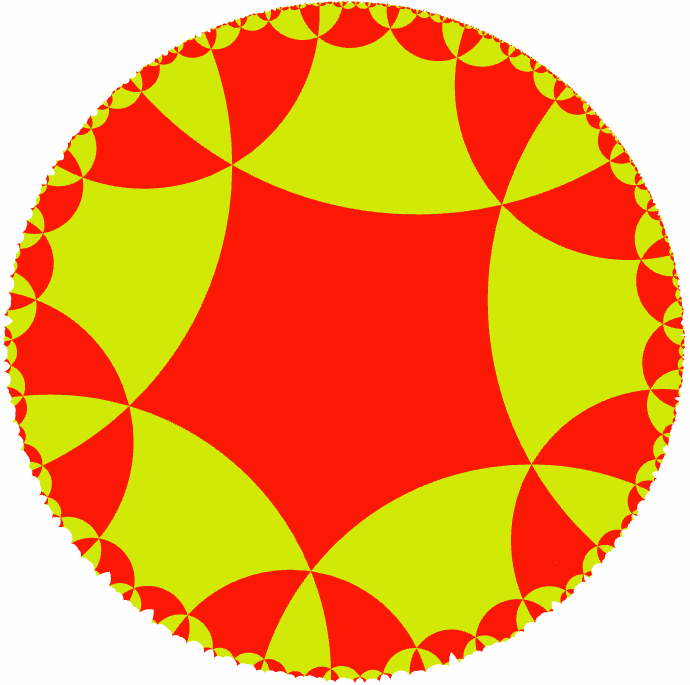

== See also ==
- List of uniform polyhedra
