= Ditrigonal polyhedron =

Type of polyhedron

In geometry, there are seven uniform and uniform dual polyhedra named as ditrigonal.

== Ditrigonal vertex figures ==
There are five uniform ditrigonal polyhedra, all with icosahedral symmetry.

The three uniform star polyhedron with Wythoff symbol of the form 3 | p q or 3/2 | p q are ditrigonal, at least if p and q are not 2. Each polyhedron includes two types of faces, being of triangles, pentagons, or pentagrams. Their vertex configurations are of the form p.q.p.q.p.q or (p.q)^{3} with a symmetry of order 3. Here, term ditrigonal refers to a hexagon having a symmetry of order 3 (triangular symmetry) acting with 2 rotational orbits on the 6 angles of the vertex figure (the word ditrigonal means "having two sets of 3 angles").

Type	Small ditrigonal icosidodecahedron	Ditrigonal dodecadodecahedron	Great ditrigonal icosidodecahedron
Image			
Vertex figure			
Vertex configuration	3.5/2.3.5/2.3.5/2	5.5/3.5.5/3.5.5/3	(3.5.3.5.3.5)/2
Faces	32; 20 {3}, 12 { 5/2 }	24; 12 {5}, 12 { 5/2 }	32; 20 {3}, 12 {5}
Wythoff symbol	3 | 5/2 3	3 | 5/3 5	3 | 3/2 5
Coxeter diagram			

== Other uniform ditrigonal polyhedra ==
The small ditrigonal dodecicosidodecahedron and the great ditrigonal dodecicosidodecahedron are also uniform.

Their duals are respectively the small ditrigonal dodecacronic hexecontahedron and great ditrigonal dodecacronic hexecontahedron.

== See also ==
- Small complex icosidodecahedron
- Great complex icosidodecahedron
