= Siegel G-function =

Class of functions in transcendental number theory

In mathematics, the Siegel G-functions are a class of functions in transcendental number theory introduced by C. L. Siegel. They satisfy a linear differential equation with polynomial coefficients, and the coefficients of their power series expansion lie in a fixed algebraic number field and have heights of at most exponential growth.

== Definition ==
A Siegel G-function is a function given by an infinite power series

$$f(z)=\sum_{n=0}^\infty a_n z^n$$

where the coefficients a_{n} all belong to the same algebraic number field, K, and with the following two properties.

1. f is the solution to a linear differential equation with coefficients that are polynomials in z. More precisely, there is a differential operator $L\in K[z,d_z], L\neq 0$, such that $L.f=0$;
2. the projective height of the first n coefficients is O(c^{n}) for some fixed constant c > 0. That is, the denominators of $a_0,\dots,a_n$ (the denominator of an algebraic number $x$ is the smallest positive integer $m$ such $mx$ is an algebraic integer) are $\leq c^n$ and the algebraic conjugates of $a_n$ have their absolute value bounded by $c^n$.

The second condition means the coefficients of f grow no faster than a geometric series. Indeed, the functions can be considered as generalisations of geometric series, whence the name G-function, just as E-functions are generalisations of the exponential function.
