= Siegel parabolic subgroup =

In mathematics, the Siegel parabolic subgroup, named after Carl Ludwig Siegel, is the parabolic subgroup of the symplectic group with abelian radical, given by the matrices of the symplectic group whose lower left quadrant is 0 (for the standard symplectic form).
