= E-function =

In mathematics, E-functions are a type of power series that satisfy particular arithmetic conditions on the coefficients. They are of interest in transcendental number theory, and are closely related to G-functions.

== Definition ==
A power series with coefficients in the field of algebraic numbers

$$f(x)=\sum_{n=0}^\infty c_n \frac{x^n}{n!} \in \overline{\mathbb{Q}}[\![x]\!]$$

is called an E-function if it satisfies the following three conditions:

- It is a solution of a non-zero linear differential equation with polynomial coefficients (this implies that all the coefficients c_{n} belong to the same algebraic number field, K, which has finite degree over the rational numbers);
- For all $\varepsilon>0$, $\overline{\left|c_n\right|}=O\left(n^{n\varepsilon}\right),$

where the left hand side represents the maximum of the absolute values of all the algebraic conjugates of c_{n};

- For all $\varepsilon>0$ there is a sequence of natural numbers q_{0}, q_{1}, q_{2},... such that q_{n}c_{k} is an algebraic integer in K for k = 0, 1, 2,..., n, and n = 0, 1, 2,... and for which $q_n=O\left(n^{n\varepsilon}\right).$

The second condition implies that f is an entire function of x.

== Uses ==
E-functions were first studied by Siegel in 1929. He found a method to show that the values taken by certain E-functions were algebraically independent. This was a result which established the algebraic independence of classes of numbers rather than just linear independence. Since then these functions have proved somewhat useful in number theory and in particular they have application in transcendence proofs and differential equations.

== The Siegel–Shidlovsky theorem ==
Perhaps the main result connected to E-functions is the Siegel–Shidlovsky theorem (also known as the Siegel and Shidlovsky theorem), named after Carl Ludwig Siegel and Andrei Borisovich Shidlovsky.

Suppose that we are given n E-functions, E_{1}(x),...,E_{n}(x), that satisfy a system of homogeneous linear differential equations

$$y^\prime_i=\sum_{j=1}^n f_{ij}(x)y_j\quad(1\leq i\leq n)$$

where the f_{ij} are rational functions of x, and the coefficients of each E and f are elements of an algebraic number field K. Then the theorem states that if E_{1}(x),...,E_{n}(x) are algebraically independent over K(x), then for any non-zero algebraic number α that is not a pole of any of the f_{ij} the numbers E_{1}(α),...,E_{n}(α) are algebraically independent.

== Examples ==
1. Any polynomial with algebraic coefficients is a simple example of an E-function.
2. The exponential function is an E-function, in its case c_{n} = 1 for all of the n.
3. If λ is an algebraic number then the Bessel function J_{λ} is an E-function.
4. The sum or product of two E-functions is an E-function. In particular E-functions form a ring.
5. If a is an algebraic number and f(x) is an E-function then f(ax) will be an E-function.
6. If f(x) is an E-function then the derivative and integral of f are also E-functions.
