= Siegel's lemma =

Theorem

In mathematics, specifically in transcendental number theory and Diophantine approximation, Siegel's lemma refers to bounds on the solutions of linear equations obtained by the construction of auxiliary functions. The existence of these polynomials was proven by Axel Thue; Thue's proof used what would be translated from German as Dirichlet's Drawers principle, which is widely known as the Pigeonhole principle. Carl Ludwig Siegel published his lemma in 1929. It is a pure existence theorem for a system of linear equations.

Siegel's lemma has been refined in recent years to produce sharper bounds on the estimates given by the lemma.

== Statement ==
Suppose we are given a system of M linear equations in N unknowns such that N > M, say

$$a_{11} X_1 + \cdots+ a_{1N} X_N = 0$$

$$\cdots$$

$$a_{M1} X_1 +\cdots+ a_{MN} X_N = 0$$

where the coefficients are integers, not all 0, and bounded by B. The system then has a solution

$$(X_1, X_2, \dots, X_N)$$

with the Xs all integers, not all 0, and bounded by

$(NB)^{M/(N-M)}.$

Bombieri & Vaaler (1983) gave the following sharper bound for the X's:

$$\max|X_j| \,\le \left(D^{-1}\sqrt{\det(AA^T)}\right)^{\!1/(N-M)}$$

where D is the greatest common divisor of the M × M minors of the matrix A, and A^{T} is its transpose. Their proof involved replacing the pigeonhole principle by techniques from the geometry of numbers.
