= Hel Braun =

German mathematician (1914–1986)

Professor Helene (Hel) Braun
- Hel Braun at the University of Marburg in 1941.
- Born: 3 June 1914; Frankfurt
- Died: 15 May 1986 (aged 71); Göttingen
- Education: University of Marburg
- Known for: Proving the convergence of the Eisenstein series
- Scientific career
- Fields: number theory, modular forms
- Workplaces: University of Göttingen, University of Hamburg
- Doctoral advisor: Carl Ludwig Siegel

Helene (Hel) Braun (June 3, 1914 – May 15, 1986) was a German mathematician who specialized in number theory and modular forms. Her autobiography, The Beginning of A Scientific Career, described her experience as a female scientist working in a male-dominated field at the time, in the Third Reich.

She is known for proving the convergence of the Eisenstein series in the space of Siegel modular forms. She also developed the foundations of the theory of Hermitian modular forms.

== Scientific career ==
Braun studied mathematics at the University of Marburg from 1933 to 1937. In 1937 she worked with Carl Ludwig Siegel in Frankfurt to study the decomposition of quadratic forms into sums of squares. Her dissertation, Über die Zerlegung quadratischer Formen in Quadrate, was also evaluated by Georg Aumann. After Braun completed that work, Siegel took her on as a scientific assistant before she became a professor in her own right teaching the theory of Hermitian forms in 1940.

She became a lecturer at the University of Göttingen in 1941, becoming a full professor in 1947. From 1947 through 1948, she was a member of the Institute for Advanced Study.

In 1951, Braun moved and became a professor at the University of Hamburg where she supervised many doctoral students including Eberhard Becker, Manfred Knebusch and Karl Mathiak and while there worked with Emil Artin and other internationally acclaimed mathematicians.

== Personal life ==
Braun never married, but in the 1960s while she was a professor at the University of Hamburg, she shared an apartment with Emil Artin.

After she retired in 1981, she lived the rest of her life in Hamburg.

== Selected publications ==
A list of the publications by Hel Braun was published by Helmut Strade in the Communications of the Mathematical Society in Hamburg, Volume XI, Issue 4, 1987. She wrote two books:

- Braun, Hel; Koecher, Max (1966), Jordan-Algebren [Jordan Algebras], Die Grundlehren der mathematischen Wissenschaften in Einzeldarstellungen mit besonderer Berücksichtigung der Anwendungsgebiete (in German), vol. 128, Berlin: Springer-Verlag, ISBN 3-540-03522-2
- Braun, Hel (1989), Koecher, Max (ed.), Eine Frau und die Mathematik 1933–1940: der Beginn einer wissenschaftlichen Laufbahn [A Woman and Mathematics 1933–1940: The beginning of a scientific career] (in German), Berlin: Springer-Verlag, doi:10.1007/978-3-642-75427-2, ISBN 3-540-52166-6.
