= Hexapentakis truncated icosahedron =

Geodesic polyhedron with 180 faces

Hexapentakis truncated icosahedron
Conway notation	ktI
Geodesic polyhedron	{3,5+}_{3,0}
Faces	180
Edges	270
Vertices	92
Face configuration	(60) V5.6.6 (120) V6.6.6
Symmetry group	Icosahedral (I_{h})
Dual polyhedron	Truncated pentakis dodecahedron
Properties	convex

The hexapentakis truncated icosahedron is a convex polyhedron constructed as an augmented truncated icosahedron. It is a geodesic polyhedron {3,5+}_{3,0}, with pentavalent vertices separated by an edge-direct distance of 3 steps.

== Construction ==
Geodesic polyhedra are constructed by subdividing faces of simpler polyhedra, and then projecting the new vertices onto the surface of a sphere. A geodesic polyhedron has straight edges and flat faces that approximate a sphere, but it can also be made as a spherical polyhedron (A tessellation on a sphere) with true geodesic curved edges on the surface of a sphere. and spherical triangle faces.

Conway	u_{3}I = (kt)I	(k5)k6tI	(k)tI	Spherical ktI
Image				
Form	3-frequency subdivided icosahedron	1-frequency subdivided hexakis truncated icosahedron	1-frequency subdivided truncated icosahedron	Spherical polyhedron

== Related polyhedra ==
Polyhedron	Truncated Icosahedron	#Pentakis truncated Icosahedron	#Hexakis truncated Icosahedron	Hexapentakis truncated Icosahedron
Image				
Conway	tI	k5tI	k6tI	k5k6tI

=== Pentakis truncated icosahedron ===
Pentakis truncated icosahedron
Conway notation	k5tI
Faces	132: 60 triangles 20 hexagons
Edges	90
Vertices	72
Symmetry group	Icosahedral (I_{h})
Dual polyhedron	Pentatruncated pentakis dodecahedron
Properties	convex

The pentakis truncated icosahedron is a convex polyhedron constructed as an augmented truncated icosahedron, adding pyramids to the 12 pentagonal faces, creating 60 new triangular faces.

It is geometrically similar to the icosahedron where the 20 triangular faces are subdivided with a central hexagon, and 3 corner triangles.

==== Dual ====
Its dual polyhedron can be called a pentatruncated pentakis dodecahedron, a dodecahedron, with its vertices augmented by pentagonal pyramids, and then truncated the apex of those pyramids, or adding a pentagonal prism to each face of the dodecahedron. It is the net of a dodecahedral prism.

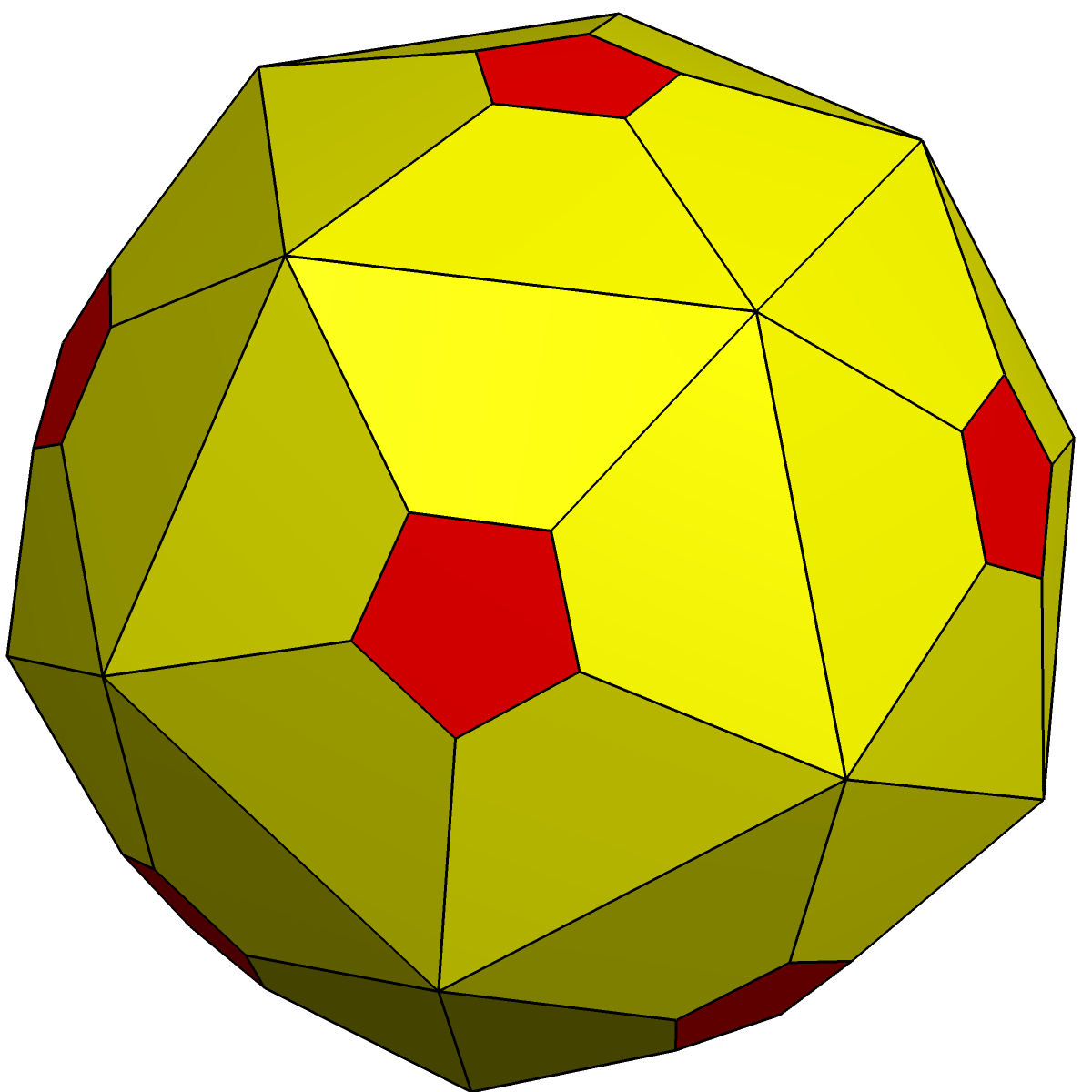

=== Hexakis truncated icosahedron ===
Hexakis truncated icosahedron
Conway notation	k6tI
Faces	132: 120 triangles 12 pentagons
Edges	210
Vertices	80
Symmetry group	Icosahedral (I_{h})
Dual polyhedron	Hexatruncated pentakis dodecahedron
Properties	convex

The hexakis truncated icosahedron is a convex polyhedron constructed as an augmented truncated icosahedron, adding pyramids to the 20 hexagonal faces, creating 120 new triangular faces.

It is visually similar to the chiral snub dodecahedron which has 80 triangles and 12 pentagons.

==== Dual ====
The dual polyhedron can be seen as a hexatruncated pentakis dodecahedron, a dodecahedron with its faces augmented by pentagonal pyramids (a pentakis dodecahedron), and then its 6-valance vertices truncated.

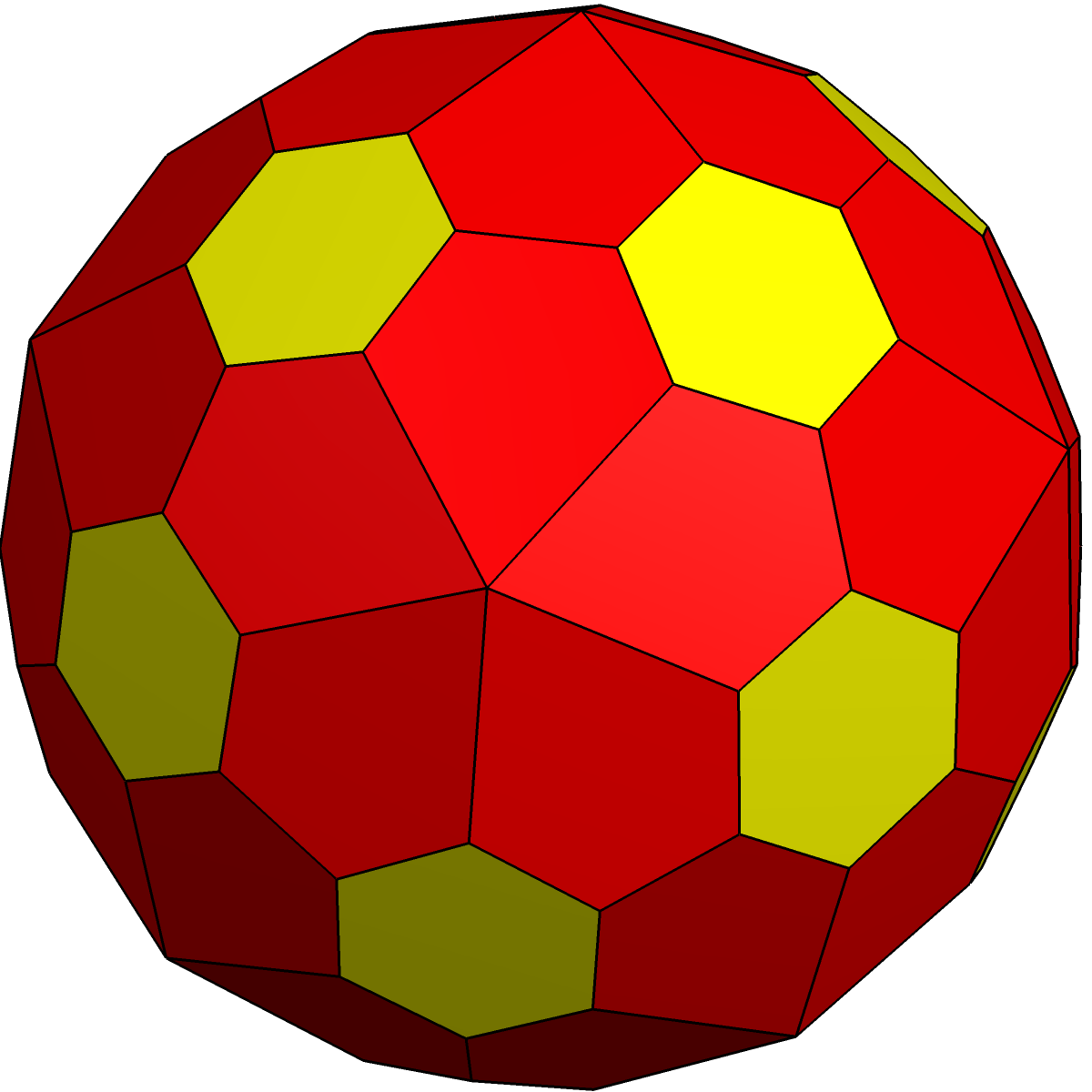

It has similar groups of irregular pentagons as the pentagonal hexecontahedron.

== See also ==
- Hexatetrakis truncated octahedron
