= Schwarz triangle =

Spherical triangle that can be used to tile a sphere

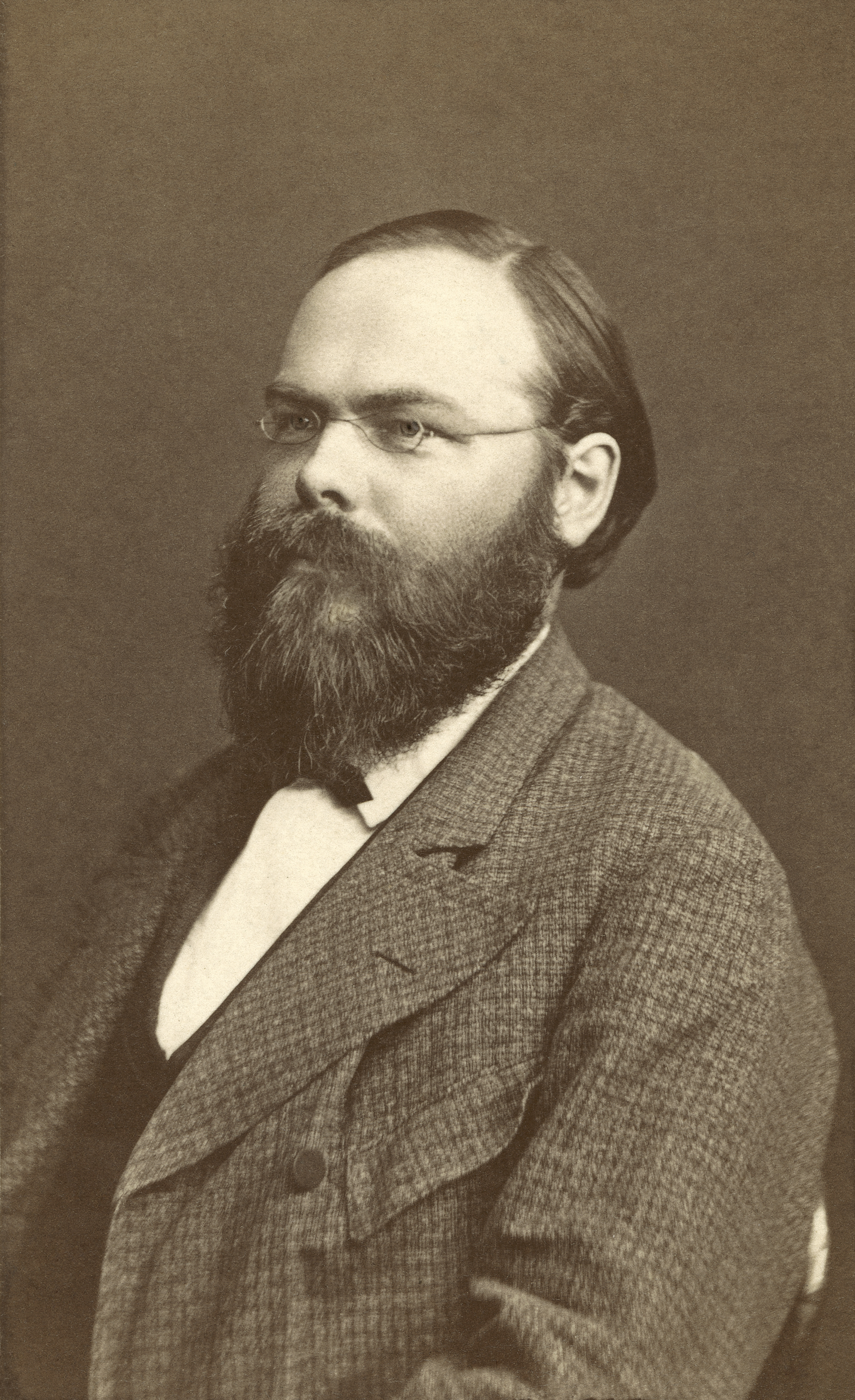
Hermann Schwarz, c. 1890

In geometry, a Schwarz triangle, named after Hermann Schwarz, is a spherical triangle that can be used to tile a sphere (spherical tiling), possibly overlapping, through reflections in its edges. They were classified in Schwarz (1873).

These can be defined more generally as tessellations of the sphere, the Euclidean plane, or the hyperbolic plane. Each Schwarz triangle on a sphere defines a finite group, while on the Euclidean or hyperbolic plane they define an infinite group.

A Schwarz triangle is represented by three rational numbers (p q r), each representing the angle at a vertex. The value n/d means the vertex angle is d/n of the half-circle. "2" means a right triangle. When these are whole numbers, the triangle is called a Möbius triangle, and corresponds to a non-overlapping tiling, and the symmetry group is called a triangle group. In the sphere there are three Möbius triangles plus one one-parameter family; in the plane there are three Möbius triangles, while in hyperbolic space there is a three-parameter family of Möbius triangles, and no exceptional objects.

== Solution space ==
A fundamental domain triangle (p q r), with vertex angles π/p, π/q, and π/r, can exist in different spaces depending on the value of the sum of the reciprocals of these integers:

$$\frac 1 p + \frac 1 q + \frac 1 r \quad
\begin{cases}
> 1 &\implies \text{Sphere} \\[2pt]
= 1 &\implies \text{Euclidean plane} \\[2pt]
< 1 &\implies \text{Hyperbolic plane}
\end{cases}$$

This is simply a way of saying that in Euclidean space the interior angles of a triangle sum to π, while on a sphere they sum to an angle greater than π, and on hyperbolic space they sum to less.

== Graphical representation ==
A Schwarz triangle is represented graphically by a triangular graph. Each node represents an edge (mirror) of the Schwarz triangle. Each edge is labeled by a rational value corresponding to the reflection order, being π/vertex angle.

Schwarz triangle (p q r) on sphere	Schwarz triangle graph

Order-2 edges represent perpendicular mirrors that can be ignored in this diagram. The Coxeter-Dynkin diagram represents this triangular graph with order-2 edges hidden.

A Coxeter group can be used for a simpler notation, as (p q r) for cyclic graphs, and (p q 2) = [p,q] for (right triangles), and (p 2 2) = [p]×[].

== A list of Schwarz triangles ==
=== Möbius triangles for the sphere ===
(2 2 2) or [2,2]	(3 2 2) or [3,2]	...
(3 3 2) or [3,3]	(4 3 2) or [4,3]	(5 3 2) or [5,3]

Schwarz triangles with whole numbers, also called Möbius triangles, include one 1-parameter family and three exceptional cases:

1. [p,2] or (p 2 2) – Dihedral symmetry,
2. [3,3] or (3 3 2) – Tetrahedral symmetry,
3. [4,3] or (4 3 2) – Octahedral symmetry,
4. [5,3] or (5 3 2) – Icosahedral symmetry,

=== Schwarz triangles for the sphere by density ===
The Schwarz triangles (p q r), grouped by density:

Density	Dihedral	Tetrahedral	Octahedral	Icosahedral
d	(2 2 n/d)			
1		(2 3 3)	(2 3 4)	(2 3 5)
2		(3/2 3 3)	(3/2 4 4)	(3/2 5 5), (5/2 3 3)
3		(2 3/2 3)		(2 5/2 5)
4			(3 4/3 4)	(3 5/3 5)
5		(2 3/2 3/2)	(2 3/2 4)	
6		(3/2 3/2 3/2)		(5/2 5/2 5/2), (3/2 3 5), (5/4 5 5)
7			(2 3 4/3)	(2 3 5/2)
8				(3/2 5/2 5)
9				(2 5/3 5)
10				(3 5/3 5/2), (3 5/4 5)
11			(2 3/2 4/3)	(2 3/2 5)
13				(2 3 5/3)
14			(3/2 4/3 4/3)	(3/2 5/2 5/2), (3 3 5/4)
16				(3 5/4 5/2)
17				(2 3/2 5/2)
18				(3/2 3 5/3), (5/3 5/3 5/2)
19				(2 3 5/4)
21				(2 5/4 5/2)
22				(3/2 3/2 5/2)
23				(2 3/2 5/3)
26				(3/2 5/3 5/3)
27				(2 5/4 5/3)
29				(2 3/2 5/4)
32				(3/2 5/4 5/3)
34				(3/2 3/2 5/4)
38				(3/2 5/4 5/4)
42				(5/4 5/4 5/4)

=== Triangles for the Euclidean plane ===
(3 3 3)	(4 4 2)	(6 3 2)

Density 1:

1. (3 3 3) – 60-60-60 (equilateral),
2. (4 4 2) – 45-45-90 (isosceles right),
3. (6 3 2) – 30-60-90,

Density 2:

1. (6 6 3/2) - 120-30-30 triangle

Density ∞:

1. (4 4/3 ∞)
2. (3 3/2 ∞)
3. (6 6/5 ∞)

=== Triangles for the hyperbolic plane ===
(7 3 2)	(8 3 2)	(5 4 2)
(4 3 3)	(4 4 3)	(∞ ∞ ∞)
Fundamental domains of (p q r) triangles

Density 1:

- (2 3 7), (2 3 8), (2 3 9) ... (2 3 ∞)
- (2 4 5), (2 4 6), (2 4 7) ... (2 4 ∞)
- (2 5 5), (2 5 6), (2 5 7) ... (2 5 ∞)
- (2 6 6), (2 6 7), (2 6 8) ... (2 6 ∞)
- (3 3 4), (3 3 5), (3 3 6) ... (3 3 ∞)
- (3 4 4), (3 4 5), (3 4 6) ... (3 4 ∞)
- (3 5 5), (3 5 6), (3 5 7) ... (3 5 ∞)
- (3 6 6), (3 6 7), (3 6 8) ... (3 6 ∞)
- ...
- (∞ ∞ ∞)

Density 2:

- (3/2 7 7), (3/2 8 8), (3/2 9 9) ... (3/2 ∞ ∞)
- (5/2 4 4), (5/2 5 5), (5/2 6 6) ... (5/2 ∞ ∞)
- (7/2 3 3), (7/2 4 4), (7/2 5 5) ... (7/2 ∞ ∞)
- (9/2 3 3), (9/2 4 4), (9/2 5 5) ... (9/2 ∞ ∞)
- ...

Density 3:

- (2 7/2 7), (2 9/2 9), (2 11/2 11) ...

Density 4:

- (7/3 3 7), (8/3 3 8), (3 10/3 10), (3 11/3 11) ...

Density 6:

- (7/4 7 7), (9/4 9 9), (11/4 11 11) ...
- (7/2 7/2 7/2), (9/2 9/2 9/2), ...

Density 10:

- (3 7/2 7)

The (2 3 7) Schwarz triangle is the smallest hyperbolic Schwarz triangle, and as such is of particular interest. Its triangle group (or more precisely the index 2 von Dyck group of orientation-preserving isometries) is the (2,3,7) triangle group, which is the universal group for all Hurwitz groups – maximal groups of isometries of Riemann surfaces. All Hurwitz groups are quotients of the (2,3,7) triangle group, and all Hurwitz surfaces are tiled by the (2,3,7) Schwarz triangle. The smallest Hurwitz group is the simple group of order 168, the second smallest non-abelian simple group, which is isomorphic to PSL(2,7), and the associated Hurwitz surface (of genus 3) is the Klein quartic.

The (2 3 8) triangle tiles the Bolza surface, a highly symmetric (but not Hurwitz) surface of genus 2.

The triangles with one noninteger angle, listed above, were first classified by Anthony W. Knapp in. A list of triangles with multiple noninteger angles is given in.

== Tessellation by Schwarz triangles ==
In this section tessellations of the hyperbolic upper half plane by Schwarz triangles will be discussed using elementary methods. For triangles without "cusps"—angles equal to zero or equivalently vertices on the real axis—the elementary approach of Carathéodory (1954) will be followed. For triangles with one or two cusps, elementary arguments of Evans (1973), simplifying the approach of Hecke (1935), will be used: in the case of a Schwarz triangle with one angle zero and another a right angle, the orientation-preserving subgroup of the reflection group of the triangle is a Hecke group. For an ideal triangle in which all angles are zero, so that all vertices lie on the real axis, the existence of the tessellation will be established by relating it to the Farey series described in Hardy & Wright (2008) and Series (2015). In this case the tessellation can be considered as that associated with three touching circles on the Riemann sphere, a limiting case of configurations associated with three disjoint non-nested circles and their reflection groups, the so-called "Schottky groups", described in detail in Mumford, Series & Wright (2015). Alternatively—by dividing the ideal triangle into six triangles with angles 0, π/2 and π/3—the tessellation by ideal triangles can be understood in terms of tessellations by triangles with one or two cusps.

=== Triangles without cusps ===
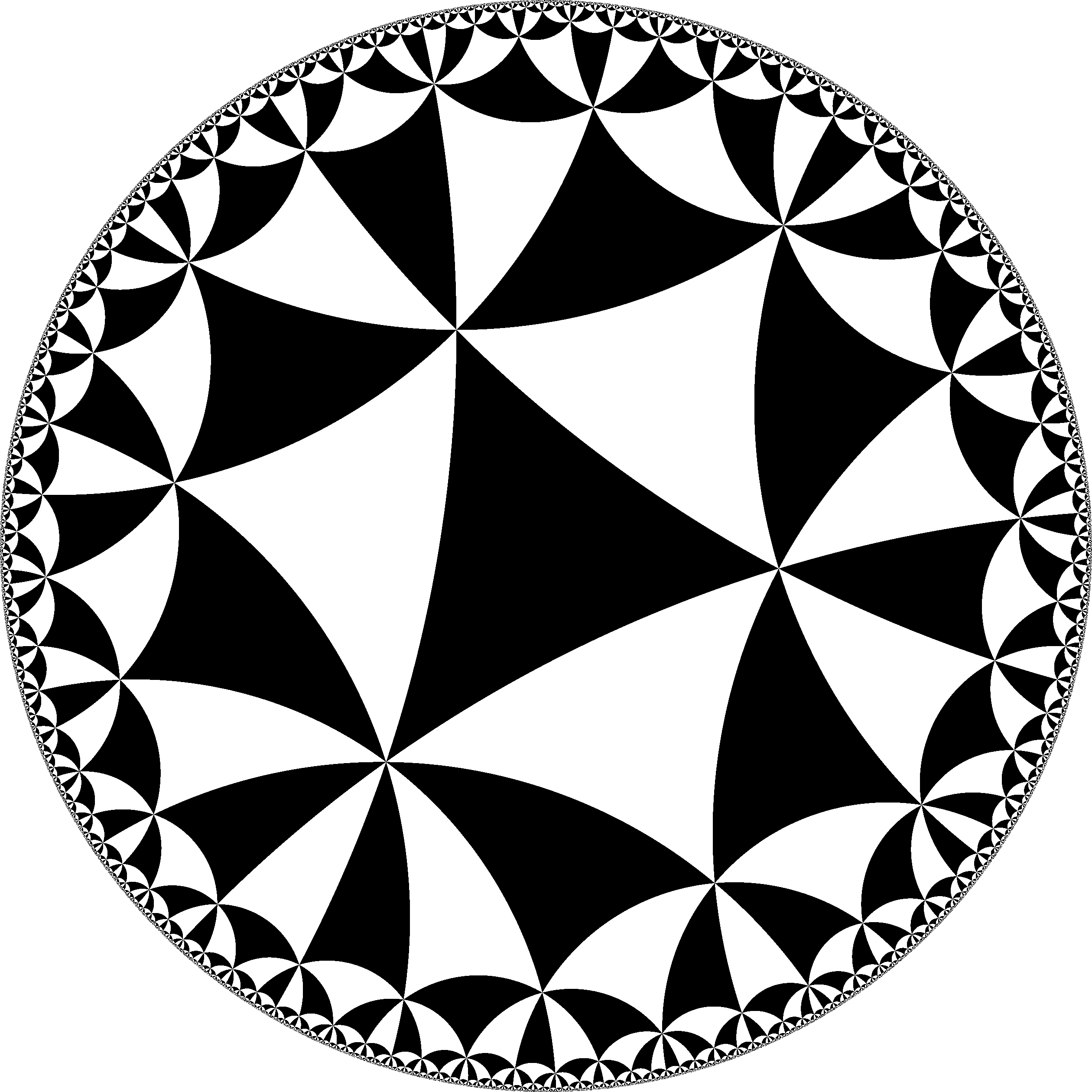
Tessellation by triangles with angles π/4, π/4 and π/5

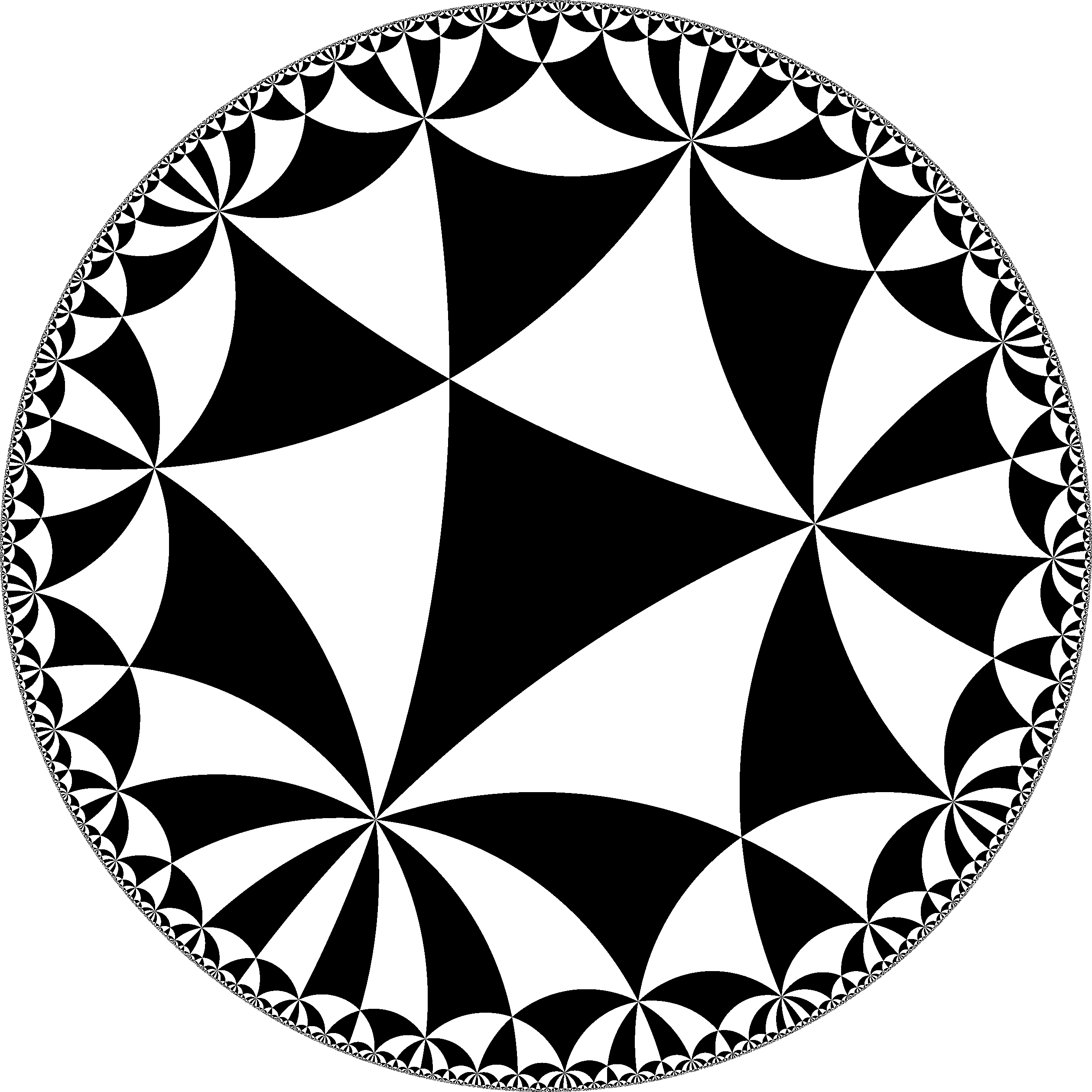
Tessellation by triangles with angles π/3, π/5 and π/7

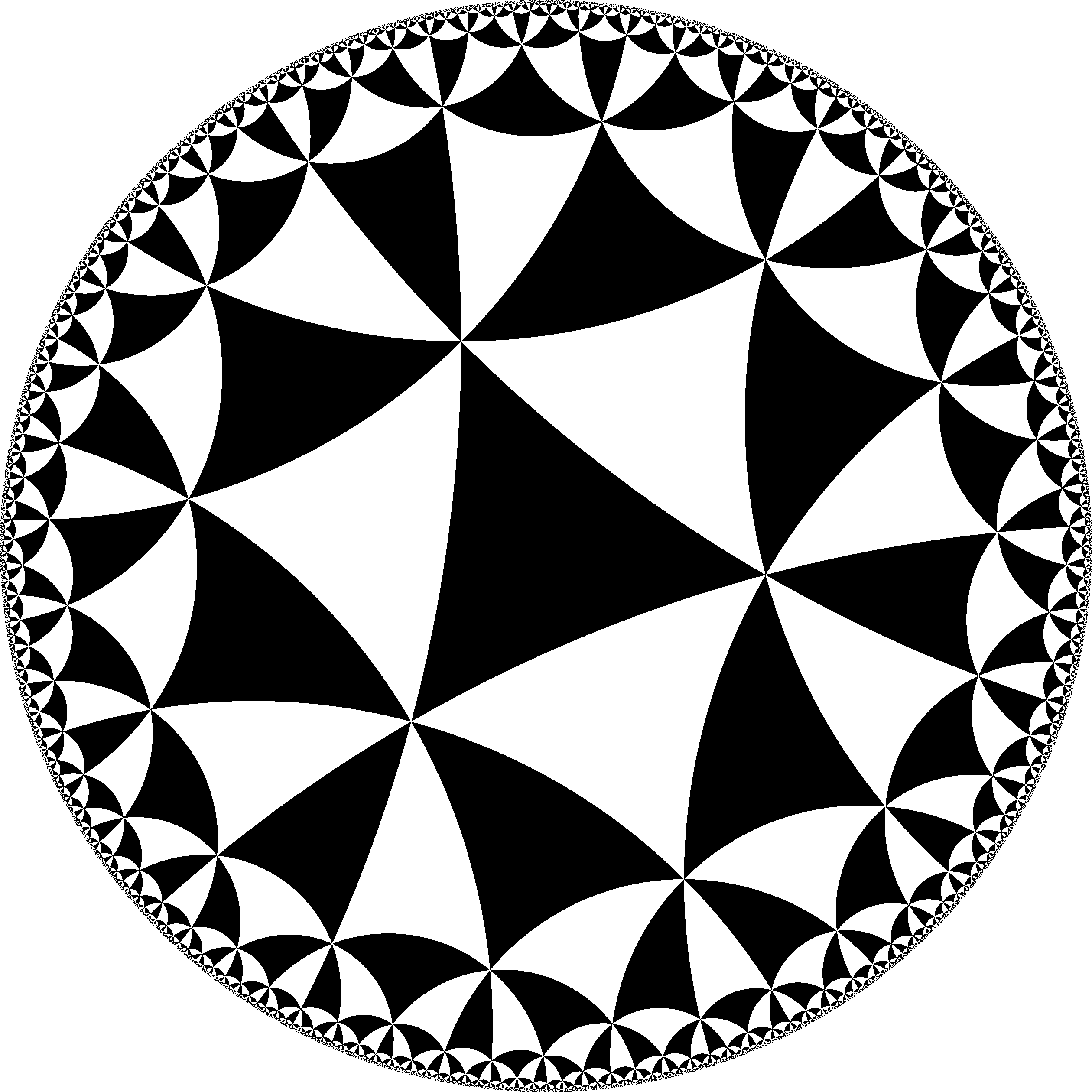
Tessellation by equilateral triangles with angles π/4

Suppose that the hyperbolic triangle Δ has angles π/a, π/b and π/c with a, b, c integers greater than 1. The hyperbolic area of Δ equals π − π/a − π/b − π/c, so that

$$\frac1a + \frac1b + \frac1c < 1.$$

The construction of a tessellation will first be carried out for the case when a, b and c are greater than 2.

The original triangle Δ gives a convex polygon P_{1} with 3 vertices. At each of the three vertices the triangle can be successively reflected through edges emanating from the vertices to produce 2m copies of the triangle where the angle at the vertex is π/m. The triangles do not overlap except at the edges, half of them have their orientation reversed and they fit together to tile a neighborhood of the point. The union of these new triangles together with the original triangle form a connected shape P_{2}. It is made up of triangles which only intersect in edges or vertices, forms a convex polygon with all angles less than or equal to π and each side being the edge of a reflected triangle. In the case when an angle of Δ equals π/3, a vertex of P_{2} will have an interior angle of π, but this does not affect the convexity of P_{2}. Even in this degenerate case when an angle of π arises, the two collinear edges are still considered as distinct for the purposes of the construction.

The construction of P_{2} can be understood more clearly by noting that some triangles or tiles are added twice, the three which have a side in common with the original triangle. The rest have only a vertex in common. A more systematic way of performing the tiling is first to add a tile to each side (the reflection of the triangle in that edge) and then fill in the gaps at each vertex. This results in a total of 3 + (2a − 3) + (2b − 3) + (2c − 3) = 2(a + b + c) − 6 new triangles. The new vertices are of two types. Those which are vertices of the triangles attached to sides of the original triangle, which are connected to 2 vertices of Δ. Each of these lie in three new triangles which intersect at that vertex. The remainder are connected to a unique vertex of Δ and belong to two new triangles which have a common edge. Thus there are 3 + (2a − 4) + (2b − 4) + (2c − 4) = 2(a + b + c) − 9 new vertices. By construction there is no overlapping. To see that P_{2} is convex, it suffices to see that the angle between sides meeting at a new vertex make an angle less than or equal to π. But the new vertices lies in two or three new triangles, which meet at that vertex, so the angle at that vertex is no greater than 2π/3 or π, as required.

This process can be repeated for P_{2} to get P_{3} by first adding tiles to each edge of P_{2} and then filling in the tiles round each vertex of P_{2}. Then the process can be repeated from P_{3}, to get P_{4} and so on, successively producing P_{n} from P_{n − 1}. It can be checked inductively that these are all convex polygons, with non-overlapping tiles. Indeed, as in the first step of the process there are two types of tile in building P_{n} from P_{n − 1}, those attached to an edge of P_{n − 1} and those attached to a single vertex. Similarly there are two types of vertex, one in which two new tiles meet and those in which three tiles meet. So provided that no tiles overlap, the previous argument shows that angles at vertices are no greater than π and hence that P_{n} is a convex polygon. (Note: As in the case of P_{2}, if an angle of Δ equals π/3, vertices where the interior angle is π stay marked as vertices and colinear edges are not coallesced.)

It therefore has to be verified that in constructing P_{n} from P_{n − 1}:

(a) the new triangles do not overlap with P_{n − 1} except as already described;

(b) the new triangles do not overlap with each other except as already described;

(c) the geodesic from any point in Δ to a vertex of the polygon P_{n − 1} makes an angle ≤ 2π/3 with each of the edges of the polygon at that vertex.

To prove (a), note that by convexity, the polygon P_{n − 1} is the intersection of the convex half-spaces defined by the full circular arcs defining its boundary. Thus at a given vertex of P_{n − 1} there are two such circular arcs defining two sectors: one sector contains the interior of P_{n − 1}, the other contains the interiors of the new triangles added around the given vertex. This can be visualized by using a Möbius transformation to map the upper half plane to the unit disk and the vertex to the origin; the interior of the polygon and each of the new triangles lie in different sectors of the unit disk. Thus (a) is proved.

Before proving (c) and (b), a Möbius transformation can be applied to map the upper half plane to the unit disk and a fixed point in the interior of Δ to the origin.

The proof of (c) proceeds by induction. Note that the radius joining the origin to a vertex of the polygon P_{n − 1} makes an angle of less than 2π/3 with each of the edges of the polygon at that vertex if exactly two triangles of P_{n − 1} meet at the vertex, since each has an angle less than or equal to π/3 at that vertex. To check this is true when three triangles of P_{n − 1} meet at the vertex, C say, suppose that the middle triangle has its base on a side AB of P_{n − 2}. By induction the radii OA and OB makes angles of less than or equal to 2π/3 with the edge AB. In this case the region in the sector between the radii OA and OB outside the edge AB is convex as the intersection of three convex regions. By induction the angles at A and B are greater than or equal to π/3. Thus the geodesics to C from A and B start off in the region; by convexity, the triangle ABC lies wholly inside the region. The quadrilateral OACB has all its angles less than π (since OAB is a geodesic triangle), so is convex. Hence the radius OC lies inside the angle of the triangle ABC near C. Thus the angles between OC and the two edges of P_{n − 1} meeting at C are less than or equal to π/3 + π/3 = 2π/3, as claimed.

To prove (b), it must be checked how new triangles in P_{n} intersect.

First consider the tiles added to the edges of P_{n − 1}. Adopting similar notation to (c), let AB be the base of the tile and C the third vertex. Then the radii OA and OB make angles of less than or equal to 2π/3 with the edge AB and the reasoning in the proof of (c) applies to prove that the triangle ABC lies within the sector defined by the radii OA and OB. This is true for each edge of P_{n − 1}. Since the interiors of sectors defined by distinct edges are disjoint, new triangles of this type only intersect as claimed.

Next consider the additional tiles added for each vertex of P_{n − 1}. Taking the vertex to be A, three are two edges AB_{1} and AB_{2} of P_{n − 1} that meet at A. Let C_{1} and C_{2} be the extra vertices of the tiles added to these edges. Now the additional tiles added at A lie in the sector defined by radii OB_{1} and OB_{2}. The polygon with vertices C_{2} O, C_{1}, and then the vertices of the additional tiles has all its internal angles less than π and hence is convex. It is therefore wholly contained in the sector defined by the radii OC_{1} and OC_{2}. Since the interiors of these sectors are all disjoint, this implies all the claims about how the added tiles intersect.

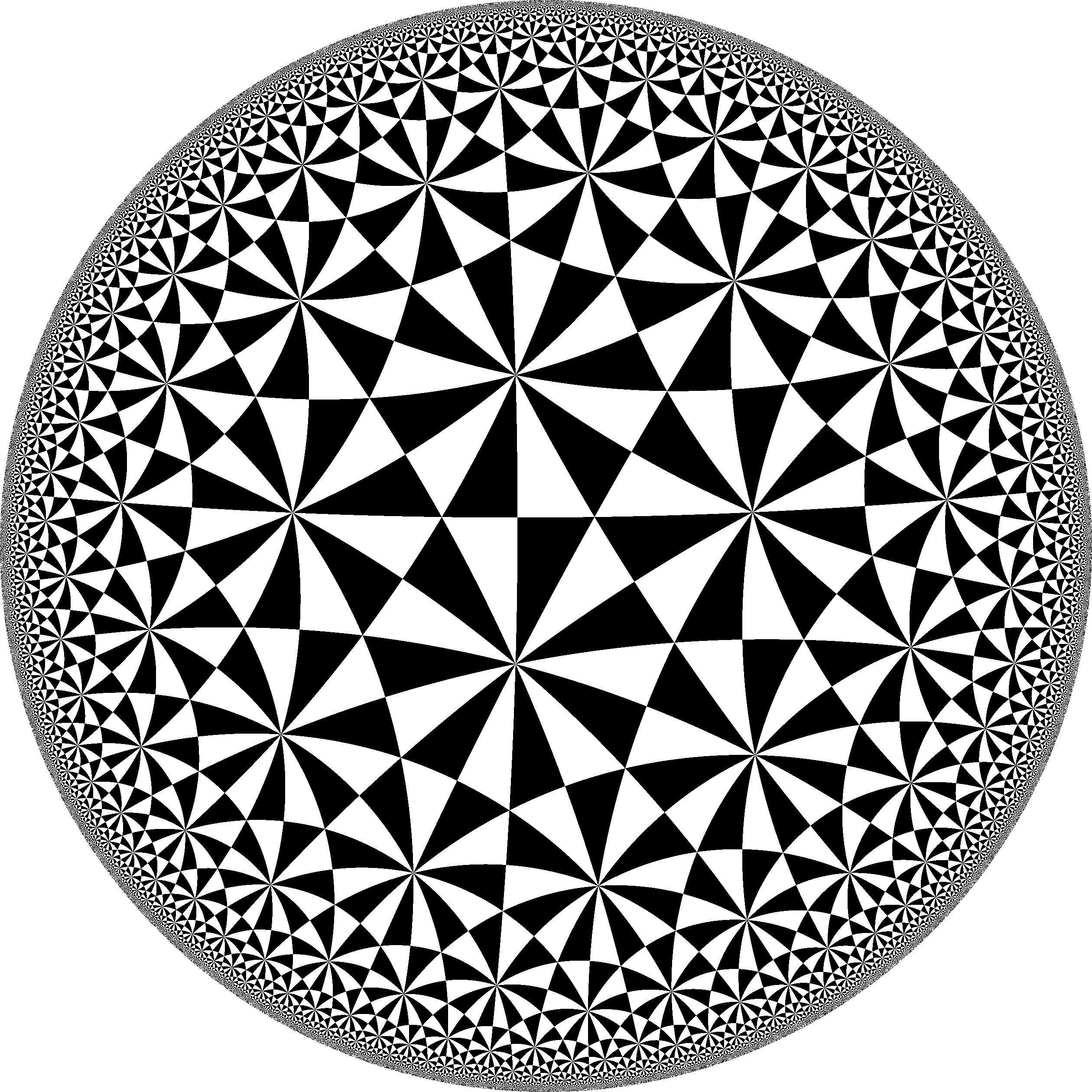
Tessellation by triangles with angles π/2, π/3 and π/7

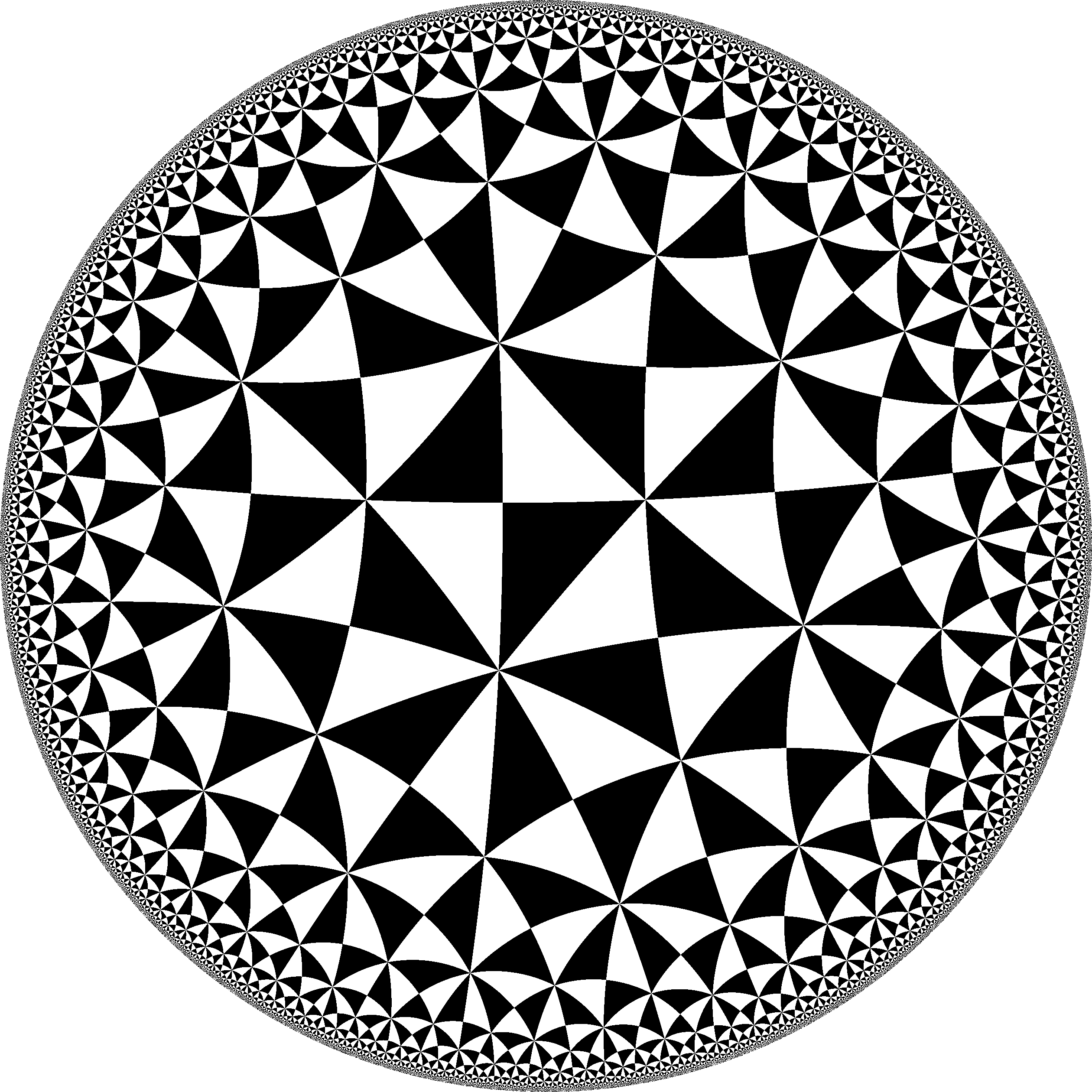
Tessellation by triangles with angles π/2, π/4 and π/5

Finally it remains to prove that the tiling formed by the union of the triangles covers the whole of the upper half plane. Any point z covered by the tiling lies in a polygon P_{n} and hence a polygon P_{n + 1}. It therefore lies in a copy of the original triangle Δ as well as a copy of P_{2} entirely contained in P_{n + 1}. The hyperbolic distance between Δ and the exterior of P_{2} is equal to r > 0. Thus the hyperbolic distance between z and points not covered by the tiling is at least r. Since this applies to all points in the tiling, the set covered by the tiling is closed. On the other hand, the tiling is open since it coincides with the union of the interiors of the polygons P_{n}. By connectivity, the tessellation must cover the whole of the upper half plane.

To see how to handle the case when an angle of Δ is a right angle, note that the inequality

$$\frac1a + \frac1b + \frac1c < 1$$.

implies that if one of the angles is a right angle, say a = 2, then both b and c are greater than 2 and one of them, b say, must be greater than 3. In this case, reflecting the triangle across the side AB gives an isosceles hyperbolic triangle with angles π/c, π/c and 2π/b. If 2π/b ≤ π/3, i.e. b is greater than 5, then all the angles of the doubled triangle are less than or equal to π/3. In that case the construction of the tessellation above through increasing convex polygons adapts word for word to this case except that around the vertex with angle 2π/b, only b—and not 2b—copies of the triangle are required to tile a neighborhood of the vertex. This is possible because the doubled triangle is isosceles. The tessellation for the doubled triangle yields that for the original triangle on cutting all the larger triangles in half.

It remains to treat the case when b equals 4 or 5. If b = 4, then c ≥ 5: in this case if c ≥ 6, then b and c can be switched and the argument above applies, leaving the case b = 4 and c = 5. If b = 5, then c ≥ 4. The case c ≥ 6 can be handled by swapping b and c, so that the only extra case is b = 5 and c = 5. This last isosceles triangle is the doubled version of the first exceptional triangle, so only that triangle Δ_{1}—with angles π/2, π/4 and π/5 and hyperbolic area π/20—needs to be considered (see below). Carathéodory (1954) handles this case by a general method which works for all right angled triangles for which the two other angles are less than or equal to π/4. The previous method for constructing P_{2}, P_{3}, ... is modified by adding an extra triangle each time an angle 3π/2 arises at a vertex. The same reasoning applies to prove there is no overlapping and that the tiling covers the hyperbolic upper half plane.

On the other hand, the given configuration gives rise to an arithmetic triangle group. These were first studied in Fricke & Klein (1897). and have given rise to an extensive literature. In 1977 Takeuchi obtained a complete classification of arithmetic triangle groups (there are only finitely many) and determined when two of them are commensurable. The particular example is related to Bring's curve and the arithmetic theory implies that the triangle group for Δ_{1} contains the triangle group for the triangle Δ_{2} with angles π/4, π/4 and π/5 as a non-normal subgroup of index 6.

Doubling the triangles Δ_{1} and Δ_{2}, this implies that there should be a relation between 6 triangles Δ_{3} with angles π/2, π/5 and π/5 and hyperbolic area π/10 and a triangle Δ_{4} with angles π/5, π/5 and π/10 and hyperbolic area 3π/5. Threlfall (1932) established such a relation directly by completely elementary geometric means, without reference to the arithmetic theory: indeed as illustrated in the fifth figure below, the quadrilateral obtained by reflecting across a side of a triangle of type Δ_{4} can be tiled by 12 triangles of type Δ_{3}. The tessellation by triangles of the type Δ_{4} can be handled by the main method in this section; this therefore proves the existence of the tessellation by triangles of type Δ_{3} and Δ_{1}.

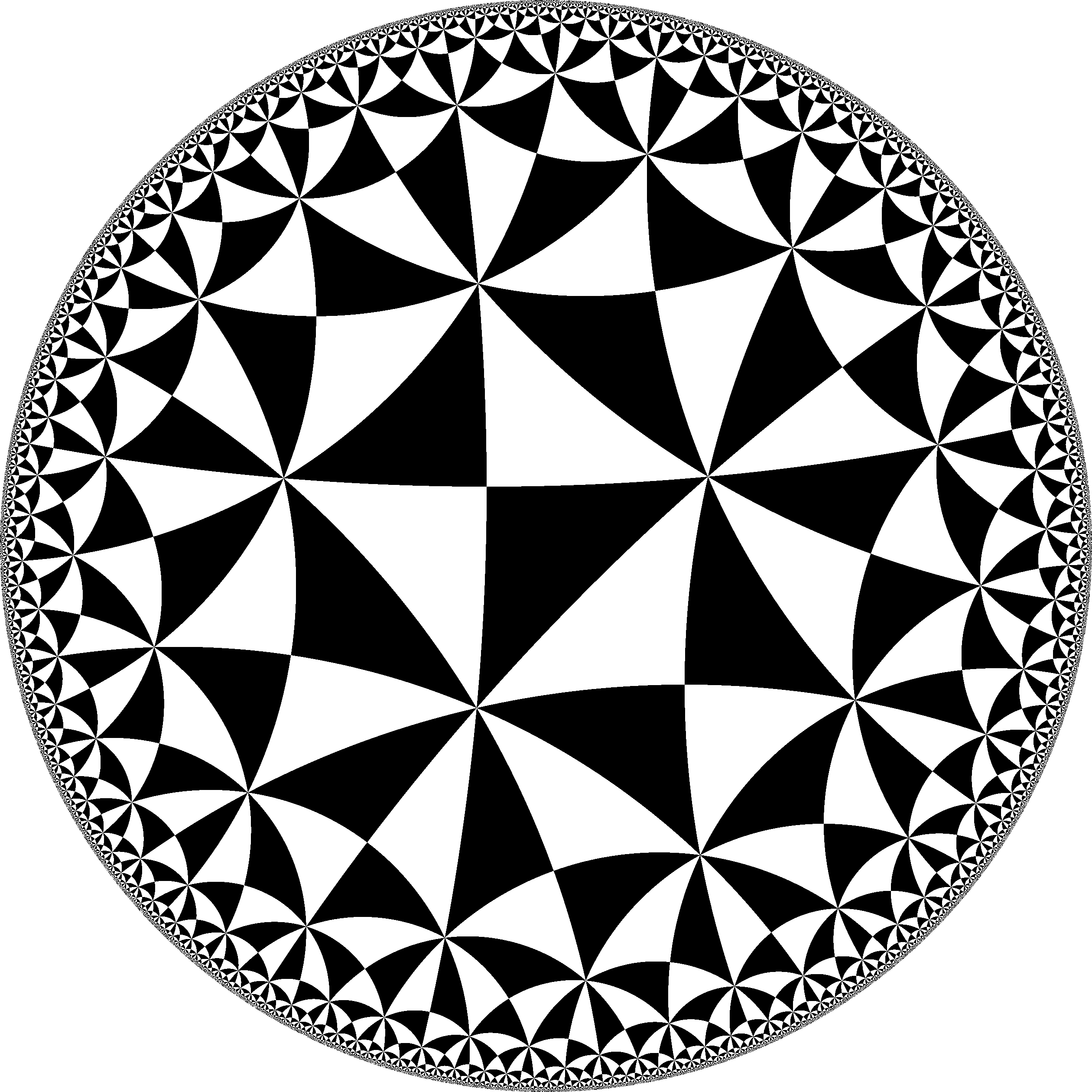
Tessellation by triangles with angles π/2, π/5 and π/5

Tessellation obtained by coalescing two triangles

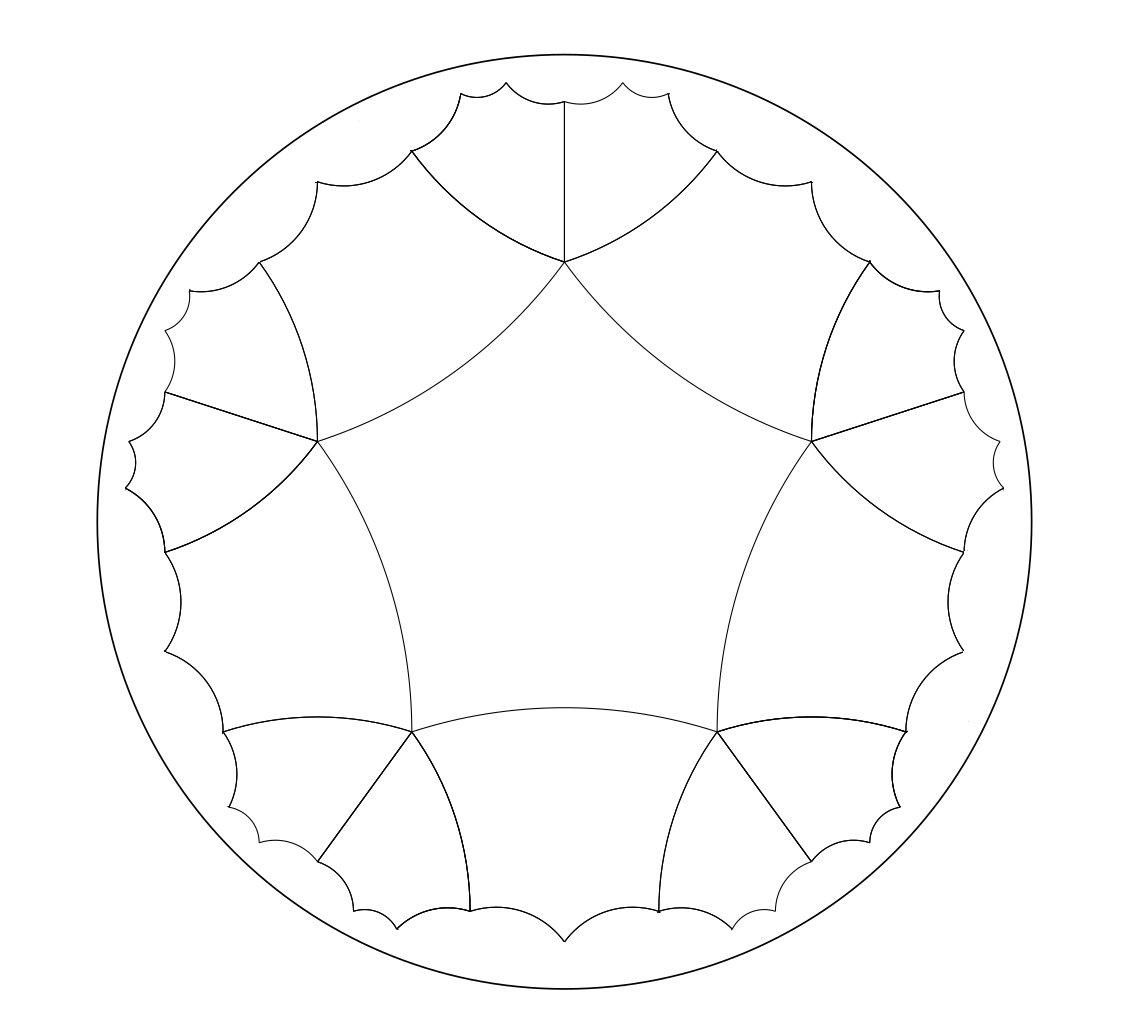
Tiling with pentagons formed from 10 (2,5,5) triangles

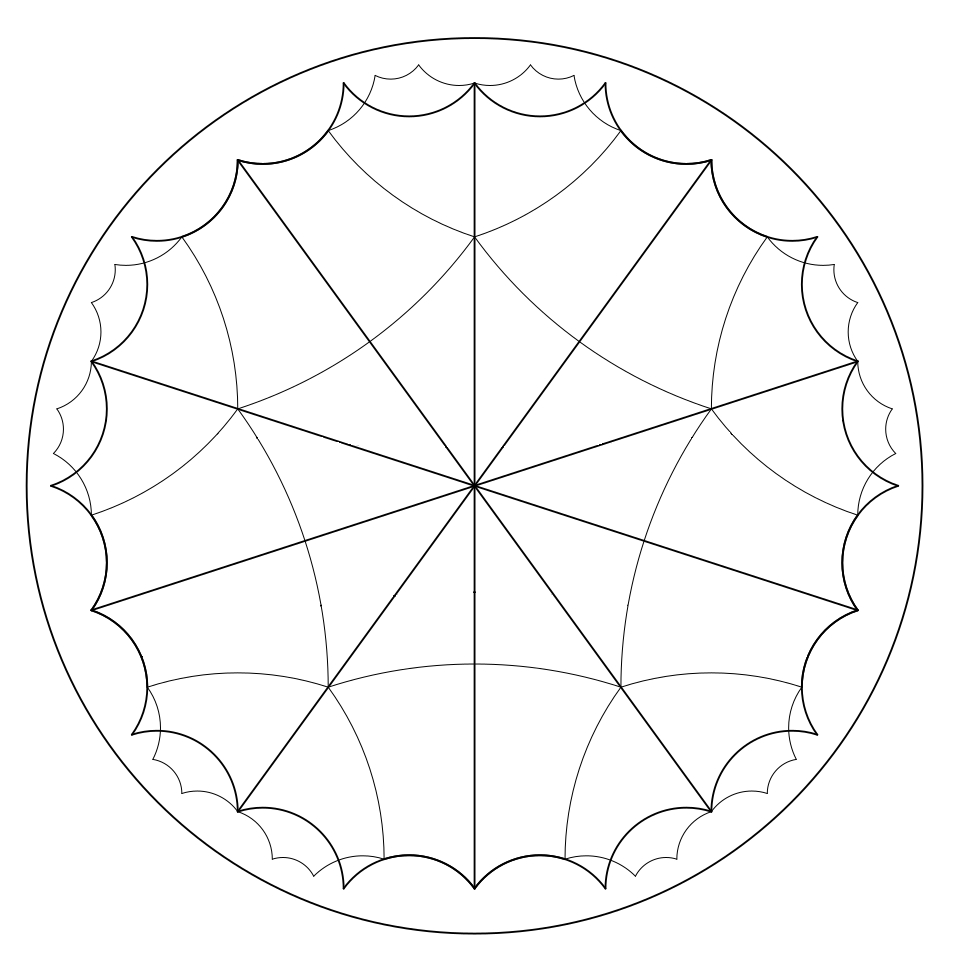
Adjusting to tiling by triangles with angles π/5, π/10, π/10

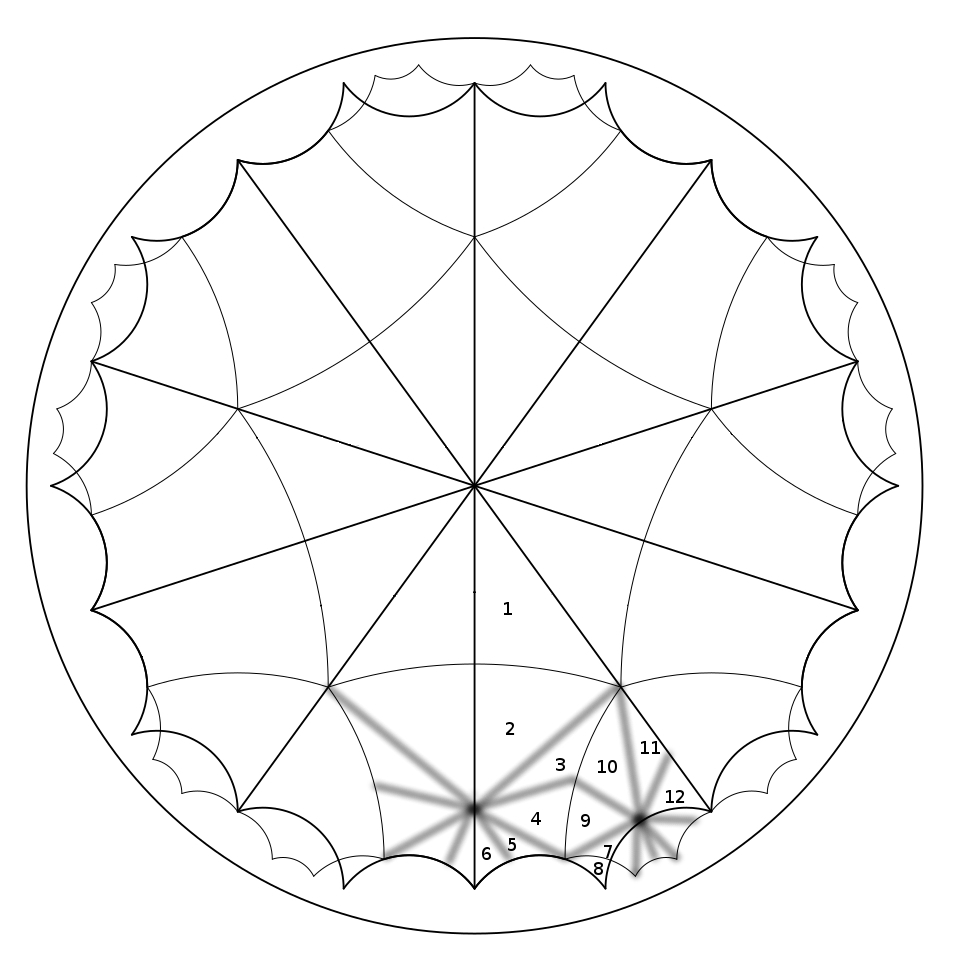
Tiling 2 (5,10,10) triangles with 12 (2,5,5) triangles

=== Triangles with one or two cusps ===
In the case of a Schwarz triangle with one or two cusps, the process of tiling becomes simpler; but it is easier to use a different method going back to Hecke to prove that these exhaust the hyperbolic upper half plane.

In the case of one cusp and non-zero angles π/a, π/b with a, b integers greater than one, the tiling can be envisaged in the unit disk with the vertex having angle π/a at the origin. The tiling starts by adding 2a − 1 copies of the triangle at the origin by successive reflections. This results in a polygon P_{1} with 2a cusps and between each two 2a vertices each with an angle π/b. The polygon is therefore convex. For each non-ideal vertex of P_{1}, the unique triangle with that vertex can be similar reflected around that vertex, thus adding 2b − 1 new triangles, 2b − 1 new ideal points and 2 b − 1 new vertices with angle π/a. The resulting polygon P_{2} is thus made up of 2a(2b − 1) cusps and the same number of vertices each with an angle of π/a, so is convex. The process can be continued in this way to obtain convex polygons P_{3}, P_{4}, and so on. The polygon P_{n} will have vertices having angles alternating between 0 and π/a for n even and between 0 and π/b for n odd. By construction the triangles only overlap at edges or vertices, so form a tiling.

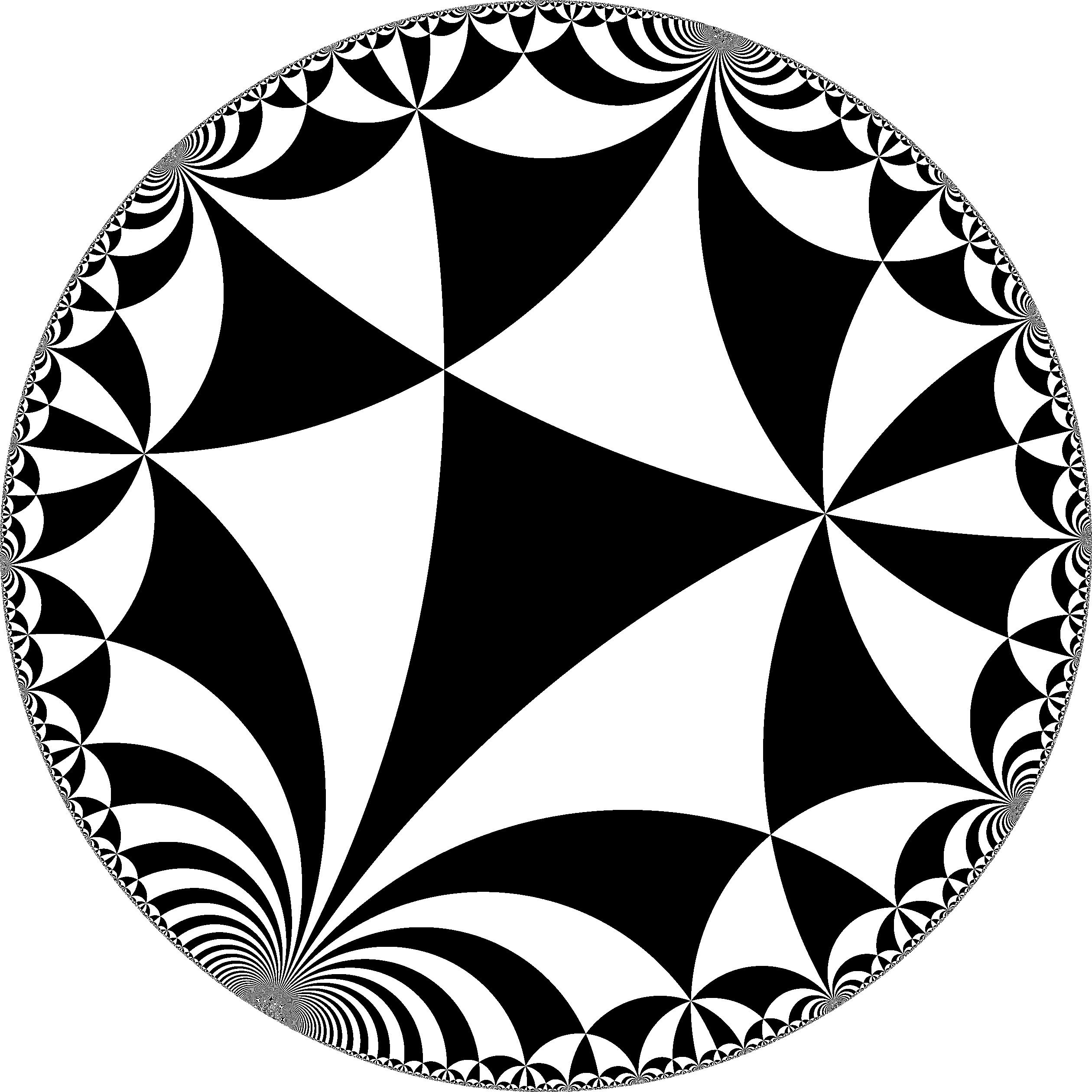
Tessellation by triangle with angles 0, π/3, π/5

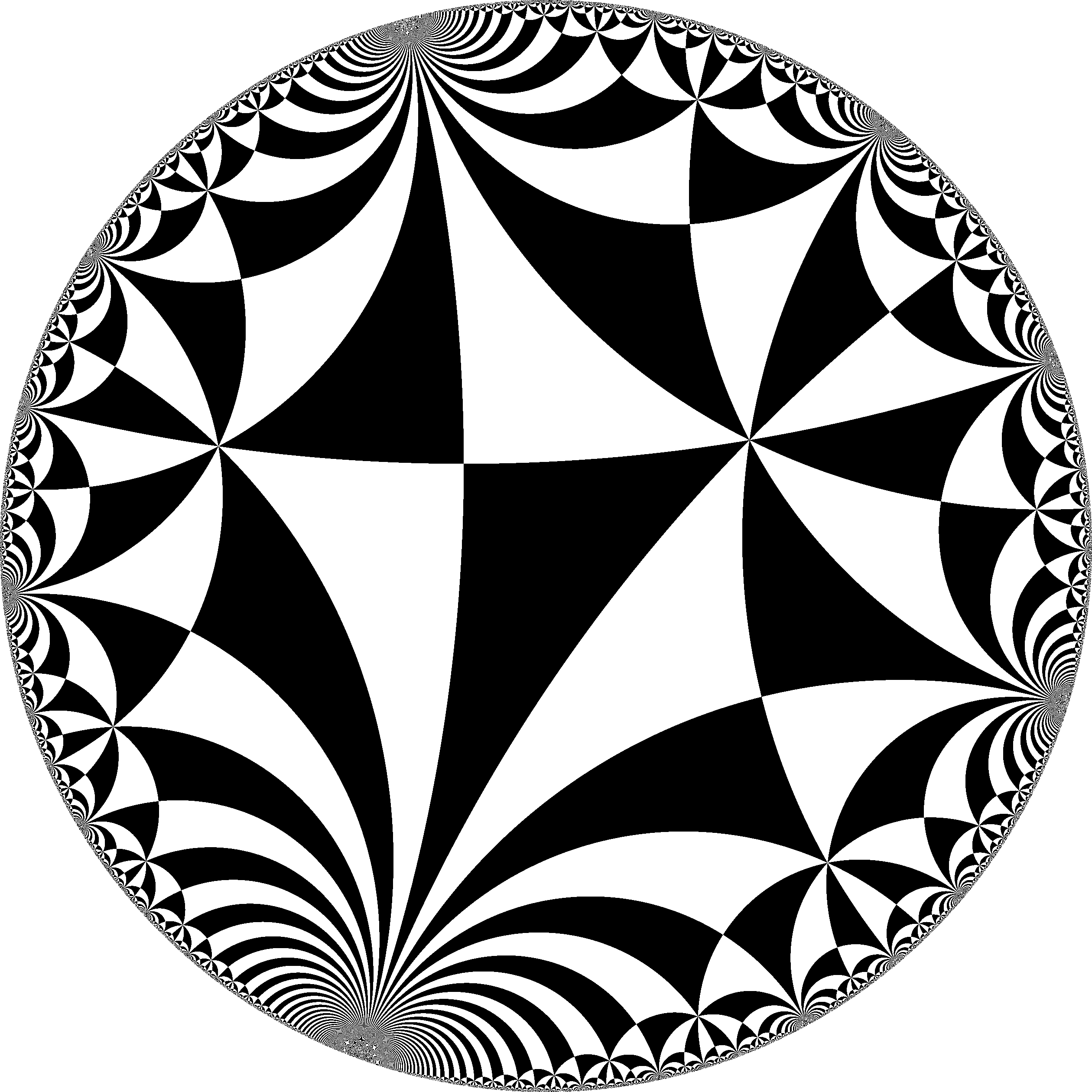
Tessellation by triangle with angles 0, π/5, π/2

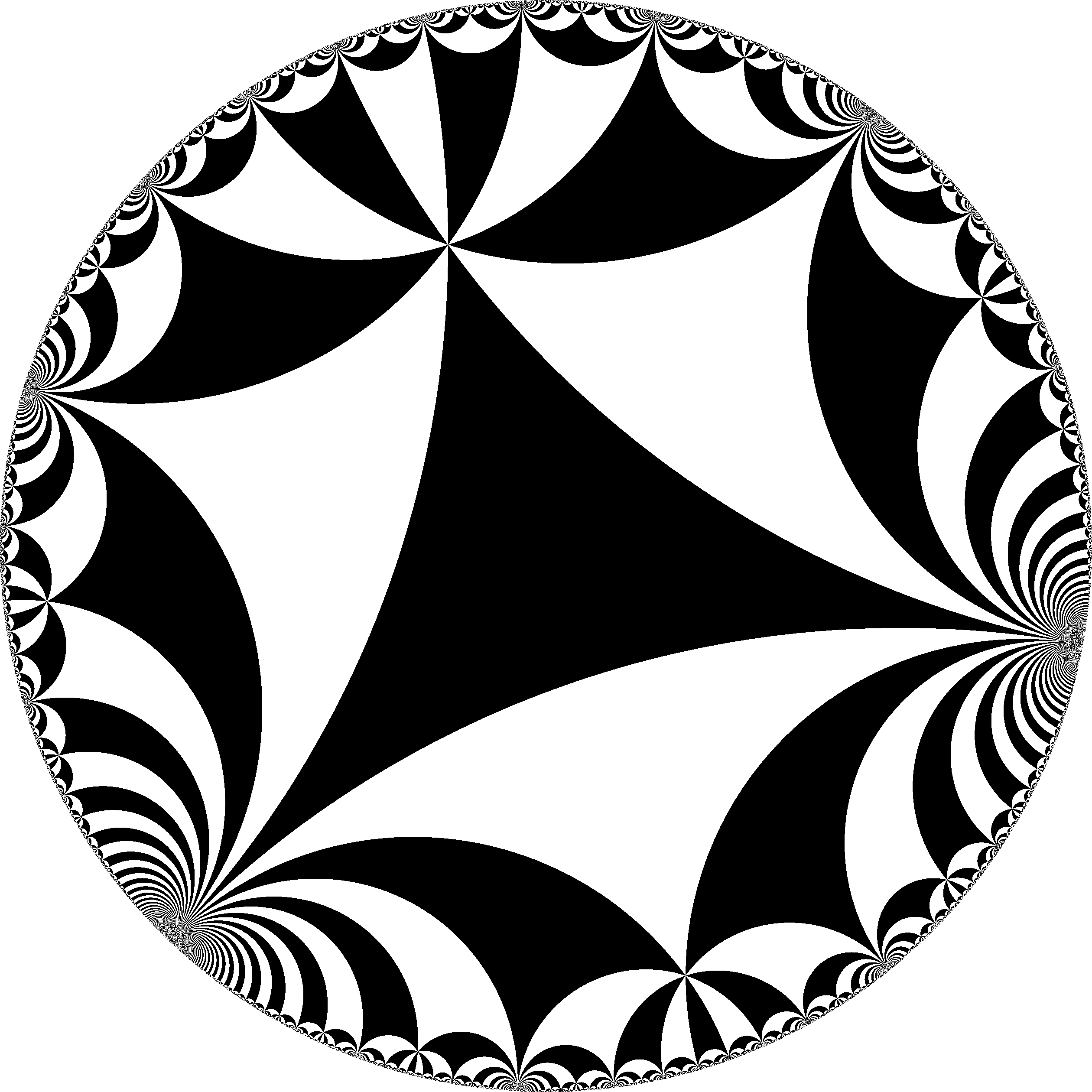
Tessellation by triangle with angles 0, 0, π/5

The case where the triangle has two cusps and one non-zero angle π/a can be reduced to the case of one cusp by observing that the trinale is the double of a triangle with one cusp and non-zero angles π/a and π/b with b = 2. The tiling then proceeds as before.

To prove that these give tessellations, it is more convenient to work in the upper half plane. Both cases can be treated simultaneously, since the case of two cusps is obtained by doubling a triangle with one cusp and non-zero angles π/a and π/2. So consider the geodesic triangle in the upper half plane with angles 0, π/a, π/b with a, b integers greater than one. The interior of such a triangle can be realised as the region X in the upper half plane lying outside the unit disk |z| ≤ 1 and between two lines parallel to the imaginary axis through points u and v on the unit circle. Let Γ be the triangle group generated by the three reflections in the sides of the triangle.

To prove that the successive reflections of the triangle cover the upper half plane, it suffices to show that for any z in the upper half plane there is a g in Γ such that g(z) lies in X̅. This follows by an argument of Evans (1973), simplified from the theory of Hecke groups. Let λ = Re a and μ = Re b so that, without loss of generality, λ < 0 ≤ μ. The three reflections in the sides are given by

$$R_1(z) = \frac1\overline{z},\ R_2(z) = -\overline{z} + \lambda,\ R_3(z)= -\overline{z} + \mu.$$

Thus T = R_{3}∘R_{2} is translation by μ − λ. It follows that for any z_{1} in the upper half plane, there is an element g_{1} in the subgroup Γ_{1} of Γ generated by T such that w_{1} = g_{1}(z_{1}) satisfies λ ≤ Re w_{1} ≤ μ, i.e. this strip is a fundamental domain for the translation group Γ_{1}. If |w_{1}| ≥ 1, then w_{1} lies in X and the result is proved. Otherwise let z_{2} = R_{1}(w_{1}) and find g_{2} Γ_{1} such that w_{2} = g_{2}(z_{2}) satisfies λ ≤ Re w_{2} ≤ μ. If |w_{2}| ≥ 1 then the result is proved. Continuing in this way, either some w_{n} satisfies |w_{n}| ≥ 1, in which case the result is proved; or |w_{n}| < 1 for all n. Now since g_{n + 1} lies in Γ_{1} and |w_{n}| < 1,

$$\operatorname{Im} g_{n+1}(z_{n+1})
= \operatorname{Im} z_{n+1}
= \operatorname{Im} \frac{w_n}{|w_n|{}^2}
= \frac{\operatorname{Im} w_n}{|w_n|{}^2}.$$

In particular

$$\operatorname{Im} w_{n+1} \ge \operatorname{Im} w_n$$

and

$$\frac{\operatorname{Im} w_{n+1}}{\operatorname{Im} w_n} = |w_n|^{-2} \ge 1.$$

Thus, from the inequality above, the points (w_{n}) lies in the compact set |z| ≤ 1, λ ≤ Re z ≤ μ and Im z ≥ Im w_{1}. It follows that |w_{n}| tends to 1; for if not, then there would be an r < 1 such that |w_{m}| ≤ r for inifitely many m and then the last equation above would imply that Im w_{n} tends to infinity, a contradiction.

Let w be a limit point of the w_{n}, so that |w| = 1. Thus w lies on the arc of the unit circle between u and v. If w ≠ u, v, then R_{1} w_{n} would lie in X for n sufficiently large, contrary to assumption. Hence w =u or v. Hence for n sufficiently large w_{n} lies close to u or v and therefore must lie in one of the reflections of the triangle about the vertex u or v, since these fill out neighborhoods of u and v. Thus there is an element g in Γ such that g(w_{n}) lies in X̅. Since by construction w_{n} is in the Γ-orbit of z_{1}, it follows that there is a point in this orbit lying in X̅, as required.

=== Ideal triangles ===
The tessellation for an ideal triangle with all its vertices on the unit circle and all its angles 0 can be considered as a special case of the tessellation for a triangle with one cusp and two nonzero angles π/3 and π/2. Indeed, the ideal triangle is made of six copies one-cusped triangle obtained by reflecting the smaller triangle about the vertex with angle π/3.

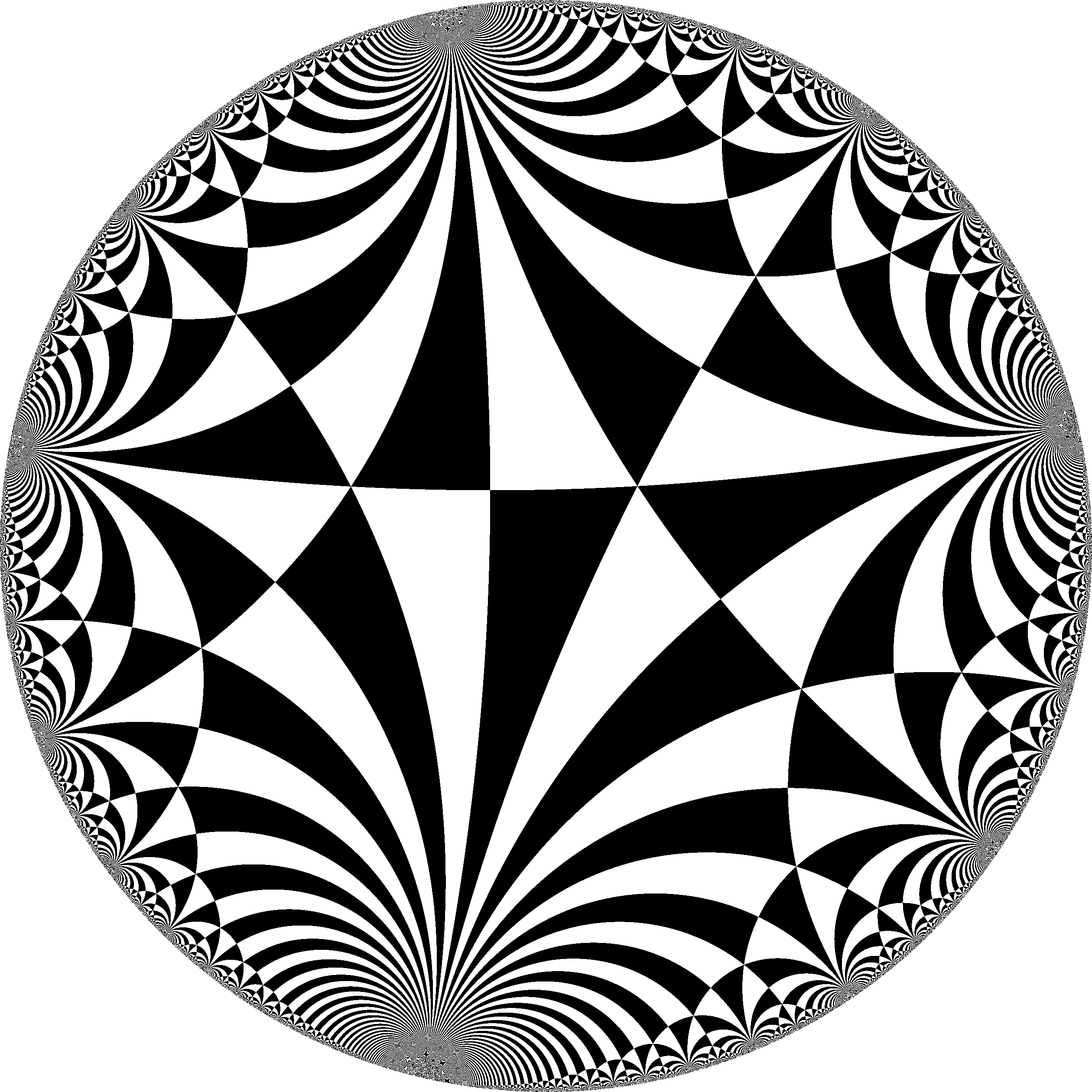
Tessellation for triangle with angles 0, π/3 and π/2

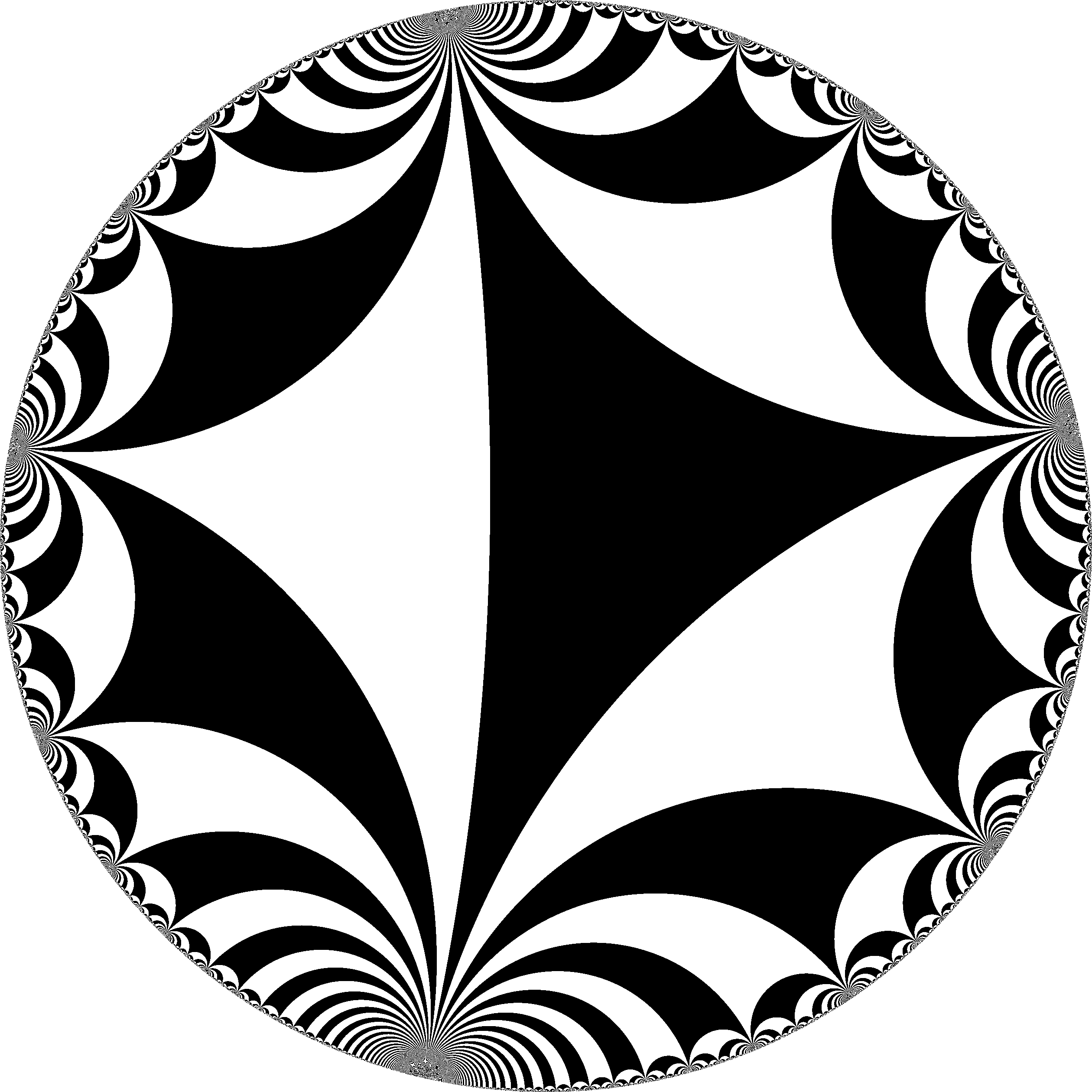
Tessellation for ideal triangle

Line drawing of tessellation by ideal triangles

D is the harmonic conjugate of C with respect to A and B

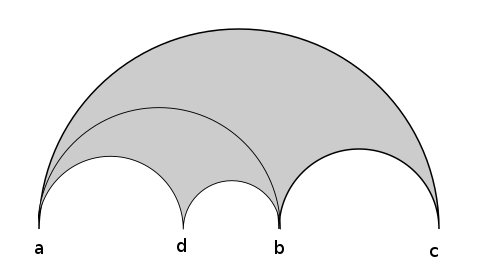
Reflection of an ideal triangle in one of its sides

Each step of the tiling, however, is uniquely determined by the positions of the new cusps on the circle, or equivalently the real axis; and these points can be understood directly in terms of Farey series following Series (2015), Hatcher (2013, pp. 20–32) and Hardy & Wright (2008, pp. 23–31). This starts from the basic step that generates the tessellation, the reflection of an ideal triangle in one of its sides. Reflection corresponds to the process of inversion in projective geometry and taking the projective harmonic conjugate, which can be defined in terms of the cross ratio. In fact if p, q, r, s are distinct points in the Riemann sphere, then there is a unique complex Möbius transformation g sending p, q and s to 0, ∞ and 1 respectively. The cross ratio (p, q; r, s) is defined to be g(r) and is given by the formula

$$(p, q; r, s) = \frac{(p-r)(q-s)}{(p-s)(q-r)}.$$

By definition it is invariant under Möbius transformations. If a, b lie on the real axis, the harmonic conjugate of c with respect to a and b is defined to be the unique real number d such that (a, b; c, d) = −1. So for example if a = 1 and b = −1, the conjugate of r is 1/r. In general Möbius invariance can be used to obtain an explicit formula for d in terms of a, b and c. Indeed, translating the centre t = (a + b)/2 of the circle with diameter having endpoints a and b to 0, d − t is the harmonic conjugate of c − t with respect to a − t and b − t. The radius of the circle is ρ = (b − a)/2 so (d − t)/ρ is the harmonic conjugate of (c − t)/ρ with respect to 1 and −1. Thus

$$\frac{d-t}\rho = \frac\rho{c-t}$$

so that

$$d = \frac{\rho^2}{r-t} + t = \frac{(c-a)b + (c-b)a}{(c-a) + (c-b)}.$$

It will now be shown that there is a parametrisation of such ideal triangles given by rationals in reduced form

$$a = \frac{p_1}{q_1},\ b = \frac{p_1 + p_2}{q_1 + q_2},\ c = \frac{p_2}{q_2}$$

with a and c satisfying the "neighbour condition" p_{2}q_{1} − q_{2}p_{1} = 1.

The middle term b is called the Farey sum or mediant of the outer terms and written

$$b = a \oplus c.$$

The formula for the reflected triangle gives

$$d = \frac{p_1 + 2p_2}{q_1 + 2q_2} = a \oplus b.$$

Similarly the reflected triangle in the second semicircle gives a new vertex b ⊕ c. It is immediately verified that a and b satisfy the neighbour condition, as do b and c.

Now this procedure can be used to keep track of the triangles obtained by successively reflecting the basic triangle Δ with vertices 0, 1 and ∞. It suffices to consider the strip with 0 ≤ Re z ≤ 1, since the same picture is reproduced in parallel strips by applying reflections in the lines Re z = 0 and 1. The ideal triangle with vertices 0, 1, ∞ reflects in the semicircle with base [0,1] into the triangle with vertices a = 0, b = 1/2, c = 1. Thus a = 0/1 and c = 1/1 are neighbours and b = a ⊕ c. The semicircle is split up into two smaller semicircles with bases [a,b] and [b,c]. Each of these intervals splits up into two intervals by the same process, resulting in 4 intervals. Continuing in this way, results into subdivisions into 8, 16, 32 intervals, and so on. At the nth stage, there are 2^{n} adjacent intervals with 2^{n} + 1 endpoints. The construction above shows that successive endpoints satisfy the neighbour condition so that new endpoints resulting from reflection are given by the Farey sum formula.

To prove that the tiling covers the whole hyperbolic plane, it suffices to show that every rational in [0,1] eventually occurs as an endpoint. There are several ways to see this. One of the most elementary methods is described in Graham, Knuth & Patashnik (1994) in their development—without the use of continued fractions—of the theory of the Stern–Brocot tree, which codifies the new rational endpoints that appear at the nth stage. They give a direct proof that every rational appears. Indeed, starting with {0/1,1/1}, successive endpoints are introduced at level n+1 by adding Farey sums or mediants (p+r)/(q+s) between all consecutive terms p/q, r/s at the nth level (as described above). Let x = a/b be a rational lying between 0 and 1 with a and b coprime. Suppose that at some level x is sandwiched between successive terms p/q < x < r/s. These inequalities force aq – bp ≥ 1 and br – as ≥ 1 and hence, since rp – qs = 1,

$$a + b = (r+s)(ap-bq) + (p+q)(br -as) \ge p+q+r+s.$$

This puts an upper bound on the sum of the numerators and denominators. On the other hand, the mediant (p+r)/(q+s) can be introduced and either equals x, in which case the rational x appears at this level; or the mediant provides a new interval containing x with strictly larger numerator-and-denominator sum. The process must therefore terminate after at most a + b steps, thus proving that x appears.

A second approach relies on the modular group G = SL(2,Z). The Euclidean algorithm implies that this group is generated by the matrices

$$S=\begin{pmatrix} 0 & 1\\ -1 & 0 \end{pmatrix},\,\,\, T=\begin{pmatrix} 1 & 1\\ 0 & 1  \end{pmatrix}.$$

In fact let H be the subgroup of G generated by S and T. Let

$$g=\begin{pmatrix} a & b\\ c & d\end {pmatrix}$$

be an element of SL(2,Z). Thus ad − cb = 1, so that a and c are coprime. Let

$$v=\begin{pmatrix}a\\ c\end{pmatrix},\,\,\, u= \begin{pmatrix}1\\ 0\end{pmatrix}.$$

Applying S if necessary, it can be assumed that |a| > |c| (equality is not possible by coprimeness). We write a = mc + r with 0 ≤ r ≤ |c|. But then

$$T^{-m}\begin{pmatrix} a\\ c \end{pmatrix} = \begin{pmatrix} r\\ c\end{pmatrix}.$$

This process can be continued until one of the entries is 0, in which case the other is necessarily ±1. Applying a power of S if necessary, it follows that v = h u for some h in H. Hence

$$h^{-1}g=\begin{pmatrix}1 & p\\ 0 & q\end{pmatrix}$$

with p, q integers. Clearly p = 1, so that h^{−1}g = T^{q}. Thus g = h T^{q} lies in H as required.

To prove that all rationals in [0,1] occur, it suffices to show that G carries Δ onto triangles in the tessellation. This follows by first noting that S and T carry Δ on to such a triangle: indeed as Möbius transformations, S(z) = −1/z and T(z) = z + 1, so these give reflections of Δ in two of its sides. But then S and T conjugate the reflections in the sides of Δ into reflections in the sides of SΔ and TΔ, which lie in Γ. Thus G normalizes Γ. Since triangles in the tessellation are exactly those of the form gΔ with g in Γ, it follows that S and T, and hence all elements of G, permute triangles in the tessellation. Since every rational is of the form g(0) for g in G, every rational in [0,1] is the vertex of a triangle in the tessellation.

The reflection group and tessellation for an ideal triangle can also be regarded as a limiting case of the Schottky group for three disjoint unnested circles on the Riemann sphere. Again this group is generated by hyperbolic reflections in the three circles. In both cases the three circles have a common circle which cuts them orthogonally. Using a Möbius transformation, it may be assumed to be the unit circle or equivalently the real axis in the upper half plane.

=== Approach of Siegel ===
In this subsection the approach of Carl Ludwig Siegel to the tessellation theorem for triangles is outlined. Siegel's less elementary approach does not use convexity, instead relying on the theory of Riemann surfaces, covering spaces and a version of the monodromy theorem for coverings. It has been generalized to give proofs of the more general Poincaré polygon theorem. (Note that the special case of tiling by regular n-gons with interior angles 2π/n is an immediate consequence of the tessellation by Schwarz triangles with angles π/n, π/n and π/2.)

Let Γ be the free product Z_{2} ∗ Z_{2} ∗ Z_{2}. If Δ = ABC is a Schwarz triangle with angles π/a, π/b and π/c, where a, b, c ≥ 2, then there is a natural map of Γ onto the group generated by reflections in the sides of Δ. Elements of Γ are described by a product of the three generators where no two adjacent generators are equal. At the vertices A, B and C the product of reflections in the sides meeting at the vertex define rotations by angles 2π/a, 2π/b and 2π/c; Let g_{A}, g_{B} and g_{C} be the corresponding products of generators of Γ = Z_{2} ∗ Z_{2} ∗ Z_{2}. Let Γ_{0} be the normal subgroup of index 2 of Γ, consisting of elements that are the product of an even number of generators; and let Γ_{1} be the normal subgroup of Γ generated by (g_{A})^{a}, (g_{B})^{b} and (g_{C})^{c}. These act trivially on Δ. Let Γ̅ = Γ/Γ_{1} and Γ̅_{0} = Γ_{0}/Γ_{1}.

The disjoint union of copies of Δ̅ indexed by elements of Γ̅ with edge identifications has the natural structure of a Riemann surface Σ. At an interior point of a triangle there is an obvious chart. As a point of the interior of an edge the chart is obtained by reflecting the triangle across the edge. At a vertex of a triangle with interior angle π/n, the chart is obtained from the 2n copies of the triangle obtained by reflecting it successively around that vertex. The group Γ̅ acts by deck transformations of Σ, with elements in Γ̅_{0} acting as holomorphic mappings and elements not in Γ̅_{0} acting as antiholomorphic mappings.

There is a natural map P of Σ into the hyperbolic plane. The interior of the triangle with label g in Γ̅ is taken onto g(Δ), edges are taken to edges and vertices to vertices. It is also easy to verify that a neighbourhood of an interior point of an edge is taken into a neighbourhood of the image; and similarly for vertices. Thus P is locally a homeomorphism and so takes open sets to open sets. The image P(Σ), i.e. the union of the translates g(Δ̅), is therefore an open subset of the upper half plane. On the other hand, this set is also closed. Indeed, if a point is sufficiently close to Δ̅ it must be in a translate of Δ̅. Indeed, a neighbourhood of each vertex is filled out the reflections of Δ̅ and if a point lies outside these three neighbourhoods but is still close to Δ̅ it must lie on the three reflections of Δ̅ in its sides. Thus there is δ > 0 such that if z lies within a distance less than δ from Δ̅, then z lies in a Γ̅-translate of Δ̅. Since the hyperbolic distance is Γ̅-invariant, it follows that if z lies within a distance less than δ from Γ(Δ̅) it actually lies in Γ(Δ̅), so this union is closed. By connectivity it follows that P(Σ) is the whole upper half plane.

On the other hand, P is a local homeomorphism, so a covering map. Since the upper half plane is simply connected, it follows that P is one-one and hence the translates of Δ tessellate the upper half plane. This is a consequence of the following version of the monodromy theorem for coverings of Riemann surfaces: if Q is a covering map between Riemann surfaces Σ_{1} and Σ_{2}, then any path in Σ_{2} can be lifted to a path in Σ_{1} and any two homotopic paths with the same end points lift to homotopic paths with the same end points; an immediate corollary is that if Σ_{2} is simply connected, Q must be a homeomorphism. To apply this, let Σ_{1} = Σ, let Σ_{2} be the upper half plane and let Q = P. By the corollary of the monodromy theorem, P must be one-one.

It also follows that g(Δ) = Δ if and only if g lies in Γ_{1}, so that the homomorphism of Γ̅_{0} into the Möbius group is faithful.

=== Hyperbolic reflection groups ===
The tessellation of the Schwarz triangles can be viewed as a generalization of the theory of infinite Coxeter groups, following the theory of hyperbolic reflection groups developed algebraically by Jacques Tits and geometrically by Ernest Vinberg. In the case of the Lobachevsky or hyperbolic plane, the ideas originate in the nineteenth-century work of Henri Poincaré and Walther von Dyck. As Joseph Lehner has pointed out in Mathematical Reviews, however, rigorous proofs that reflections of a Schwarz triangle generate a tessellation have often been incomplete, his own 1964 book "Discontinuous Groups and Automorphic Functions", being one example. Carathéodory's elementary treatment in his 1950 textbook Funktiontheorie, translated into English in 1954, and Siegel's 1954 account using the monodromy principle are rigorous proofs. The approach using Coxeter groups will be summarised here, within the general framework of classification of hyperbolic reflection groups.

Let r, s, t be symbols and let a, b, c ≥ 2 be integers, possibly ∞, with

$${1 \over a} + {1 \over b} + {1 \over c} < 1.$$

Define Γ to be the group with presentation having generators r, s, t that are all involutions and satisfy
$$\begin{align}
(st)^a &= 1, \\[2pt]
(tr)^b &= 1, \\[2pt]
(rs)^c &= 1.
\end{align}$$
If one of the integers is infinite, then the product has infinite order. The generators r, s, t are called the simple reflections.

Set
$$\begin{align}
A &= \begin{cases}
\cos\frac{\pi}{a} &\text{if } a \geq 2 \text{ is finite,} \\[2pt]
\cosh x,\ x > 0 &\text{otherwise.}
\end{cases} \\[8pt]
B &= \begin{cases}
\cos\frac{\pi}{b} &\text{if } b \geq 2 \text{ is finite,} \\[2pt]
\cosh y,\ y > 0 &\text{otherwise.}
\end{cases} \\[8pt]
C &= \begin{cases}
\cos\frac{\pi}{c} &\text{if } c \geq 2 \text{ is finite,} \\[2pt]
\cosh z,\ z > 0 &\text{otherwise.}
\end{cases}
\end{align}$$
Let e_{r}, e_{s}, e_{t} be a basis for a 3-dimensional real vector space V with symmetric bilinear form Λ such that
$$\begin{align}
\Lambda(\mathbf{e}_s, \mathbf{e}_t) &= -A, \\[2pt]
\Lambda(\mathbf{e}_t, \mathbf{e}_r) &= -B, \\[2pt]
\Lambda(\mathbf{e}_r, \mathbf{e}_s) &= -C ,
\end{align}$$
with the three diagonal entries equal to one. The symmetric bilinear form Λ is non-degenerate with signature (2, 1). Define:
$$\begin{align}
\rho(\mathbf{v}) &= \mathbf{v} - 2 \Lambda(\mathbf{v},\mathbf{e}_r) \mathbf{e}_r \\[2pt]
\sigma(\mathbf{v}) &= \mathbf{v} - 2 \Lambda(\mathbf{v},\mathbf{e}_s) \mathbf{e}_s \\[2pt]
\tau(\mathbf{v}) &= \mathbf{v} - 2 \Lambda(\mathbf{v},\mathbf{e}_t) \mathbf{e}_t
\end{align}$$

Theorem (geometric representation). The operators ρ, σ, τ are involutions on V, with respective eigenvectors e_{r}, e_{s}, e_{t} with simple eigenvalue −1. The products of the operators have orders corresponding to the presentation above (so στ has order a, etc). The operators ρ, σ, τ induce a representation of Γ on V which preserves Λ.

The bilinear form Λ for the basis has matrix

$$M = \begin{pmatrix}
1 & -C  & -B\\
-C & 1 & -A\\
-B & -A & 1\\
\end{pmatrix},$$

so has determinant
$$\det(M) = 1 -  A^2 - B^2 - C^2 - 2ABC.$$
If c = 2, say, then the eigenvalues of the matrix are $1,\ 1 \pm \sqrt{A^2 + B^2}.$ The condition $\tfrac{1}{a} + \tfrac{1}{b} < \tfrac{1}{2}$ immediately forces $A^2 + B^2 > 1,$ so that Λ must have signature (2, 1). So in general a, b, c ≥ 3. Clearly the case where all are equal to 3 is impossible. But then the determinant of the matrix is negative while its trace is positive. As a result two eigenvalues are positive and one negative, i.e. Λ has signature (2, 1). Manifestly ρ, σ, τ are involutions, preserving Λ with the given −1 eigenvectors.

To check the order of the products like στ, it suffices to note that:

1. the reflections σ and τ generate a finite or infinite dihedral group;
2. the 2-dimensional linear span U of e_{s} and e_{t} is invariant under σ and τ, with the restriction of Λ positive-definite;
3. W, the orthogonal complement of U, is negative-definite on Λ, and σ and τ act trivially on W.

(1) is clear since if γ = στ generates a normal subgroup with σγσ^{−1} = γ^{−1}. For (2), U is invariant by definition and the matrix is positive-definite since $0 < \cos\tfrac{\pi}{a} < 1.$ Since Λ has signature (2, 1), a non-zero vector w in W must satisfy Λ(w, w) < 0. By definition, σ has eigenvalues 1 and −1 on U, so w must be fixed by σ. Similarly w must be fixed by τ, so that (3) is proved. Finally in (1)

$$\begin{alignat}{5}
\sigma(\mathbf{e}_s) &= -{\mathbf e}_s, &\quad   \tau(\mathbf{e}_s) &= 2 \cos(\tfrac{\pi}{a}) \, \mathbf{e}_s + \mathbf{e}_t, \\[2pt]
\sigma(\mathbf{e}_t) &= 2 \cos(\tfrac{\pi}{a}) \, \mathbf{e}_s + \mathbf{e}_t, &\quad \tau(\mathbf{e}_t) &= -{\mathbf e}_t,
\end{alignat}$$

so that, if a is finite, the eigenvalues of στ are −1, ς and ς^{−1}, where $\varsigma = e^{\frac{2\pi i}{a}};$ and if a is infinite, the eigenvalues are −1, X and X^{−1}, where $X = e^{2x}.$ Moreover a straightforward induction argument shows that if $\theta = \tfrac{\pi}{a}$ then

$$\begin{align}
(\sigma\tau)^m({\mathbf e}_s) &= \left[ \frac{\sin(2m+1)\theta}{\sin\theta} \right] {\mathbf e}_s + \left[ \frac{\sin 2m\theta}{\sin\theta} \right]{\mathbf e}_t, \\[4pt]
\tau(\sigma\tau)^m({\mathbf e}_s) &= \left[ \frac{\sin(2m+1)\theta}{\sin\theta} \right]{\mathbf e}_s + \left[ \frac{\sin(2m+2)\theta}{\sin\theta} \right] {\mathbf e}_t,
\end{align}$$

and if x > 0 then

$$\begin{align}
(\sigma\tau)^m({\mathbf e}_s) &= \left[ \frac{\sinh(2m+1)x}{\sinh x} \right] {\mathbf e}_s + \left[ \frac{\sinh 2mx}{\sinh x} \right] {\mathbf e}_t, \\[4pt]
\lim_{x \to 0} \ (\sigma\tau)^m(\mathbf{e}_s) &= (2m+1)\mathbf{e}_s + 2m\mathbf{e}_t; \\[12pt]
\tau(\sigma\tau)^m({\mathbf e}_s) &= \left[ \frac{\sinh(2m+1)x}{\sinh x} \right] {\mathbf e}_s + \left[ \frac{\sinh (2m+2)x}{\sinh x} \right] {\mathbf e}_t, \\[4pt]
\lim_{x \to 0} \, \tau(\sigma\tau)^m(\mathbf{e}_s) &= (2m+1)\mathbf{e}_s + (2m+2)\mathbf{e}_t.
\end{align}$$

Let Γ_{a} be the dihedral subgroup of Γ generated by s and t, with analogous definitions for Γ_{b} and Γ_{c}. Similarly define Γ_{r} to be the cyclic subgroup of Γ given by the 2-group {1, r}, with analogous definitions for Γ_{s} and Γ_{t}. From the properties of the geometric representation, all six of these groups act faithfully on V. In particular Γ_{a} can be identified with the group generated by σ and τ; as above it decomposes explicitly as a direct sum of the 2-dimensional irreducible subspace U and the 1-dimensional subspace W with a trivial action. Thus there is a unique vector
$$\mathbf w = \mathbf{e}_r + \lambda\mathbf{e}_s + \mu\mathbf{e}_t$$
in W satisfying σ(w) = w and τ(w) = w. Explicitly,
$$\lambda = \frac{C + AB}{1 - A^2}, \quad \mu = \frac{B + AC}{1 - A^2}.$$

Remark on representations of dihedral groups. It is well known that, for finite-dimensional real inner product spaces, two orthogonal involutions S and T can be decomposed as an orthogonal direct sum of 2-dimensional or 1-dimensional invariant spaces; for example, this can be deduced from the observation of Paul Halmos and others, that the positive self-adjoint operator (S − T)^{2} commutes with both S and T. In the case above, however, where the bilinear form Λ is no longer a positive definite inner product, different ad hoc reasoning has to be given.

Theorem (Tits). The geometric representation of the Coxeter group is faithful.

This result was first proved by Tits in the early 1960s and first published in the text of Bourbaki (1968) with its numerous exercises. In the text, the fundamental chamber was introduced by an inductive argument; exercise 8 in §4 of Chapter V was expanded by Vinay Deodhar to develop a theory of positive and negative roots and thus shorten the original argument of Tits.

Let X be the convex cone of sums κe_{r} + λe_{s} + μe_{t} with real non-negative coefficients, not all of them zero. For g in the group Γ, define ℓ(g), the word length or length, to be the minimum number of reflections from r, s, t required to write g as an ordered composition of simple reflections. Define a positive root to be a vector ge_{r}, ge_{s} or ge_{r} lying in X, with g in Γ. (Note: Here Γ is regarded as acting on V through the geometric representation.)

It is routine to check from the definitions that

- if |ℓ(gq) – ℓ(g)| = 1 for a simple reflection q and, if g ≠ 1, there is always a simple reflection q such that ℓ(g) = ℓ(gq) + 1;
- for g and h in Γ, ℓ(gh) ≤ ℓ(g) + ℓ(h).

Proposition. If g is in Γ and ℓ(gq) = ℓ(g) ± 1 for a simple reflection q, then ge_{q} lies in ±X, and is therefore a positive or negative root, according to the sign.

Replacing g by gq, only the positive sign needs to be considered. The assertion will be proved by induction on ℓ(g) = m, it being trivial for m = 0. Assume that ℓ(gs) = ℓ(g) + 1. If ℓ(g) = m > 0, without less of generality it may be assumed that the minimal expression for g ends with ...t. Since s and t generate the dihedral group Γ_{a}, g can be written as a product g = hk, where k = (st)^{n} or t(st)^{n} and h has a minimal expression that ends with ...r, but never with s or t. This implies that ℓ(hs) = ℓ(h) + 1 and ℓ(ht) = ℓ(h) + 1. Since ℓ(h) < m, the induction hypothesis shows that both he_{s}, he_{t} lie in X. It therefore suffices to show that ke_{s} has the form λe_{s} + μe_{t} with λ, μ ≥ 0, not both 0. But that has already been verified in the formulas above.

Corollary (proof of Tits' theorem). The geometric representation is faithful.

It suffices to show that if g fixes e_{r}, e_{s}, e_{t}, then g = 1. Considering a minimal expression for g ≠ 1, the conditions ℓ(gq) = ℓ(g) + 1 clearly cannot be simultaneously satisfied by the three simple reflections q.

Note that, as a consequence of Tits' theorem, the generators (left) satisfy the conditions (right):
$$\begin{alignat}{5}
(g &= st) \ \ \text{ s.t. } & g^a = 1,\\[4pt]
(h &= tr) \ \ \text{ s.t. } & h^b = 1,\\[4pt]
(k &= rs) \ \ \text{ s.t. } & k^c = 1, \\[4pt]
&& ghk = 1.
\end{alignat}$$
This gives a presentation of the orientation-preserving index 2 normal subgroup Γ_{1} of Γ. The presentation corresponds to the fundamental domain obtained by reflecting two sides of the geodesic triangle to form a geodesic parallelogram (a special case of Poincaré's polygon theorem).

Further consequences. The roots are the disjoint union of the positive roots and the negative roots. The simple reflection q permutes every positive root other than e_{q}. For g in Γ, ℓ(g) is the number of positive roots made negative by g.

Fundamental domain and Tits cone.

Let G be the 3-dimensional closed Lie subgroup of GL(V) preserving Λ. As V can be identified with a 3-dimensional Lorentzian or Minkowski space with signature (2,1), the group G is isomorphic to the Lorentz group O(2,1) and therefore $\mathrm{SL}_\pm(2,\R) \setminus \{\pm \,I\,\}.$ (Note: SL_{±}(2,R) is the subgroup of GL(2,R) with determinant ±1.) Choosing e to be a positive root vector in X, the stabilizer of e is a maximal compact subgroup K of G isomorphic to O(2). The homogeneous space X = G / K is a symmetric space of constant negative curvature, which can be identified with the 2-dimensional hyperboloid or Lobachevsky plane $\mathfrak{H}^2$. The discrete group Γ acts discontinuously on G / K: the quotient space Γ \ G / K is compact if a, b, c are all finite, and of finite area otherwise. Results about the Tits fundamental chamber have a natural interpretation in terms of the corresponding Schwarz triangle, which translate directly into the properties of the tessellation of the geodesic triangle through the hyperbolic reflection group Γ. The passage from Coxeter groups to tessellation can first be found in the exercises of §4 of Chapter V of Bourbaki (1968), due to Tits, and in Iwahori (1966); currently numerous other equivalent treatments are available, not always directly phrased in terms of symmetric spaces.

=== Approach of Maskit, de Rham and Beardon ===
Maskit (1971) gave a general proof of Poincaré's polygon theorem in hyperbolic space; a similar proof was given in de Rham (1971). Specializing to the hyperbolic plane and Schwarz triangles, this can be used to give a modern approach for establishing that the existence of Schwarz triangle tessellations, as described in Beardon (1983) and Maskit (1988). The Swiss mathematicians de la Harpe (1991) and Haefliger have provided an introductory account, taking geometric group theory as their starting point.

== See also ==
- Density (polytope)
- Goursat tetrahedron
- List of uniform polyhedra by Schwarz triangle
- Nonconvex uniform polyhedron
- Regular hyperbolic tiling
- Uniform polyhedron
- Uniform tilings in hyperbolic plane
- Wythoff construction
- Wythoff symbol
