= List of incomplete proofs =

A technical argument by a trusted author, which is hard to check and looks similar to arguments known to be correct, is hardly ever checked in detail.

— Vladimir Voevodsky,

This page lists notable examples of incomplete or incorrect published mathematical proofs. Most of these were accepted as complete or correct for several years but later discovered to contain gaps or errors. There are both examples where a complete proof was later found, or where the alleged result turned out to be false.

== Results later proved rigorously ==
- Euclid's Elements. Euclid's proofs are essentially correct, but strictly speaking sometimes contain gaps because he tacitly uses some unstated assumptions, such as the existence of intersection points. In 1899 David Hilbert gave a complete set of (second order) axioms for Euclidean geometry, called Hilbert's axioms, and between 1926 and 1959 Tarski gave some complete sets of first order axioms, called Tarski's axioms.
- Isoperimetric inequality. For three dimensions it states that the shape enclosing the maximum volume for its surface area is the sphere. It was formulated by Archimedes but not proved rigorously until the 19th century, by Hermann Schwarz.
- Infinitesimals. In the 18th century there was widespread use of infinitesimals in calculus, though these were not really well defined. Calculus was put on firm foundations in the 19th century, and Robinson put infinitesimals in a rigorous basis with the introduction of nonstandard analysis in the 20th century.
- Fundamental theorem of algebra (see History). Many incomplete or incorrect attempts were made at proving this theorem in the 18th century, including by d'Alembert (1746), Euler (1749), de Foncenex (1759), Lagrange (1772), Laplace (1795), Wood (1798), and Gauss (1799). The first rigorous proof was published by Argand in 1806.
- Dirichlet's theorem on arithmetic progressions. In 1808 Legendre published an attempt at a proof of Dirichlet's theorem, but as Dupré pointed out in 1859 one of the lemmas used by Legendre is false. Dirichlet gave a complete proof in 1837.
- The proofs of the Kronecker–Weber theorem by Kronecker (1853) and Weber (1886) both had gaps. The first complete proof was given by Hilbert in 1896.
- In 1879, Alfred Kempe published a purported proof of the four color theorem, whose validity as a proof was accepted for eleven years before it was refuted by Percy Heawood. Peter Guthrie Tait gave another incorrect proof in 1880 which was shown to be incorrect by Julius Petersen in 1891. Kempe's proof did, however, suffice to show the weaker five color theorem. The four-color theorem was eventually proved by Kenneth Appel and Wolfgang Haken in 1976.
- Schröder–Bernstein theorem. In 1896 Schröder published a proof sketch which, however, was shown to be faulty by Alwin Reinhold Korselt in 1911 (confirmed by Schröder).
- Fermat's Last Theorem. An initial proof was released by Andrew Wiles in June 1993 but was found to contain an error in September of that year. Wiles would go on to publish a corrected proof in 1995.
- Jordan curve theorem. There has been some controversy about whether Jordan's original proof of this in 1887 contains gaps. Oswald Veblen in 1905 claimed that Jordan's proof is incomplete, but in 2007 Hales said that the gaps are minor and that Jordan's proof is essentially complete.
- In 1905 Lebesgue tried to prove the (correct) result that a function implicitly defined by a Baire function is Baire, but his proof incorrectly assumed that the projection of a Borel set is Borel. Suslin pointed out the error and was inspired by it to define analytic sets as continuous images of Borel sets.
- Dehn's lemma. Dehn published an attempted proof in 1910, but Kneser found a gap in 1929. It was finally proved in 1956 by Christos Papakyriakopoulos.
- Hilbert's sixteenth problem about the finiteness of the number of limit cycles of a plane polynomial vector field. Henri Dulac published a partial solution to this problem in 1923, but in about 1980 Écalle and Ilyashenko independently found a serious gap, and fixed it in about 1991.
- In 1929 Lazar Lyusternik and Lev Schnirelmann published a proof of the theorem of the three geodesics, which was later found to be flawed. The proof was completed by Werner Ballmann about 50 years later.
- Littlewood–Richardson rule. Robinson published an incomplete proof in 1938, though the gaps were not noticed for many years. The first complete proofs were given by Marcel-Paul Schützenberger in 1977 and Thomas in 1974.
- Class numbers of imaginary quadratic fields. In 1952 Heegner published a solution to this problem. His paper was not accepted as a complete proof as it contained a gap, and the first complete proofs were given in about 1967 by Baker and Stark. In 1969 Stark showed how to fill the gap in Heegner's paper.
- In 1954 Igor Shafarevich published a proof that every finite solvable group is a Galois group over the rationals. However Schmidt pointed out a gap in the argument at the prime 2, which Shafarevich fixed in 1989.
- Nielsen realization problem. Kravetz claimed to solve this in 1959 by first showing that Teichmüller space is negatively curved, but in 1974 Masur showed that it is not negatively curved. The Nielsen realization problem was finally solved in 1980 by Kerckhoff.
- Yamabe problem. Yamabe claimed a solution in 1960, but Trudinger discovered a gap in 1968, and a complete proof was not given until 1984.
- Mordell conjecture over function fields. Manin published a proof in 1963, but Coleman (1990) found and corrected a gap in the proof.
- In 1973 Britton published a 282-page attempted solution of Burnside's problem. In his proof he assumed the existence of a set of parameters satisfying some inequalities, but Adian pointed out that these inequalities were inconsistent. Novikov and Adian had previously found a correct solution around 1968.
- Classification of finite simple groups. In 1983, Gorenstein announced that the proof of the classification had been completed, but he had been misinformed about the status of the proof of classification of quasithin groups, which had a serious gap in it. A complete proof for this case was published by Aschbacher and Smith in 2004.
- In 1986, Spencer Bloch published the paper "Algebraic Cycles and Higher K-theory" which introduced a higher Chow group, a precursor to motivic cohomology. The paper used an incorrect moving lemma; the lemma was later replaced by 30 pages of complex arguments that "took many years to be accepted as correct."
- Kepler conjecture. Hsiang published an incomplete proof of this in 1993. In 1998 Hales published a proof depending on long computer calculations.

== Incorrect results ==
- In 1759 Euler claimed that there were no closed knight tours on a chess board with 3 rows, but in 1917 Ernest Bergholt found tours on 3 × 10 and 3 × 12 boards.
- Euler's conjecture on Graeco-Latin squares. In the 1780s Euler conjectured that no such squares exist for any oddly even number n ≡ 2 (mod 4). In 1959, R. C. Bose and S. S. Shrikhande constructed counterexamples of order 22. Then E. T. Parker found a counterexample of order 10 using a one-hour computer search. Finally Parker, Bose, and Shrikhande showed this conjecture to be false for all n ≥ 10.
- In 1798 A. M. Legendre claimed that 6 is not the sum of 2 rational cubes, which as Lamé pointed out in 1865 is false as 6 = (37/21)^{3} + (17/21)^{3}.
- In 1803, Gian Francesco Malfatti claimed to prove that a certain arrangement of three circles would cover the maximum possible area inside a right triangle. However, to do so he made certain unwarranted assumptions about the configuration of the circles. It was shown in 1930 that circles in a different configuration could cover a greater area, and in 1967 that Malfatti's configuration was never optimal. See Malfatti circles.
- In 1806 André-Marie Ampère claimed to prove that a continuous function is differentiable at most points (though it is not entirely clear what he was claiming as he did not give a precise definition of a function). However, in 1872 Weierstrass gave an example of a continuous function that was not differentiable anywhere: The Weierstrass function.
- Intersection theory. In 1848 Steiner claimed that the number of conics tangent to 5 given conics is 7776 = 6^{5}, but later realized this was wrong. The correct number 3264 was found by Berner in 1865 and by Ernest de Jonquieres around 1859 and by Chasles in 1864 using his theory of characteristics. However these results, like many others in classical intersection theory, do not seem to have been given complete proofs until the work of Fulton and Macpherson in about 1978.
- Dirichlet's principle. This was used by Riemann in 1851, but Weierstrass found a counterexample to one version of this principle in 1870, and Hilbert stated and proved a correct version in 1900.
- Cayley (1878) incorrectly claimed that there are three different groups of order 6. This mistake is strange because in an earlier 1854 paper he correctly stated that there are just two such groups.
- In 1885, Evgraf Fedorov classified the convex polyhedra with congruent rhombic faces, but missed a case. Stanko Bilinski in 1960 rediscovered the Bilinski dodecahedron (forgotten after its previous 1752 publication) and proved that, with the addition of this shape, the classification was complete.
- Wronskians. In 1887 Mansion claimed in his textbook that if a Wronskian of some functions vanishes everywhere then the functions are linearly dependent. In 1889 Peano pointed out the counterexample x^{2} and x|x|. The result is correct if the functions are analytic.
- Vahlen (1891) published a purported example of an algebraic curve in 3-dimensional projective space that could not be defined as the zeros of 3 polynomials, but in 1941 Perron found 3 equations defining Vahlen's curve. In 1961 Kneser showed that any algebraic curve in projective 3-space can be given as the zeros of 3 polynomials.
- In 1898 Miller published a paper incorrectly claiming to prove that the Mathieu group M_{24} does not exist, though in 1900 he pointed out that his proof was wrong.
- Little claimed in 1900 that the writhe of a reduced knot diagram is an invariant. However, in 1974 Perko discovered a counterexample called the Perko pair, a pair of knots listed as distinct in tables for many years that are in fact the same.
- Hilbert's twenty-first problem. In 1908 Plemelj claimed to have shown the existence of Fuchsian differential equations with any given monodromy group, but in 1989 Bolibruch discovered a counterexample.
- In 1925 Ackermann published a proof that a weak system can prove the consistency of a version of analysis, but von Neumann found an explicit mistake in it a few years later. Gödel's incompleteness theorems showed that it is not possible to prove the consistency of analysis using weaker systems.
- Groups of order 64. In 1930 Miller published a paper claiming that there are 294 groups of order 64. Hall and Senior showed in 1964 that the correct number is 267.
- Kurt Gödel proved in 1933 that the truth of a certain class of sentences of first-order arithmetic, known in the literature as [∃^{*}∀^{2}∃^{*}, all, (0)], was decidable. That is, there was a method for deciding correctly whether any statement of that form was true. In the final sentence of that paper, he asserted that the same proof would work for the decidability of the larger class [∃^{*}∀^{2}∃^{*}, all, (0)]_{=}, which also includes formulas that contain an equality predicate. However, in the mid-1960s, Stål Aanderaa showed that Gödel's proof would not go through for the larger class, and in 1982 Warren Goldfarb showed that validity of formulas from the larger class was in fact undecidable.
- Grunwald–Wang theorem. Wilhelm Grunwald published an incorrect proof in 1933 of an incorrect theorem, and George Whaples later published another incorrect proof. Shianghao Wang found a counterexample in 1948 and published a corrected version of the theorem in 1950.
- In 1934 Severi claimed that the space of rational equivalence classes of cycles on an algebraic surface is finite-dimensional, but Mumford (1968) showed that this is false for surfaces of positive geometric genus.
- Jacobian conjecture. Keller asked this as a question in 1939, and in the next few years there were several published incomplete proofs, including 3 by B. Segre, but Vitushkin found gaps in many of them. More incomplete proofs were later announced. Hyman Bass, Edwin H. Connell, and David Wright (1982) discuss the errors in some of these incomplete proofs. In 2026, Levent Alpöge found a counterexample for all n > 2.
- One of many examples from algebraic geometry in the first half of the 20th century: Severi (1946) claimed that a degree-n surface in 3-dimensional projective space has at most (^{n+2}_{3})−4 nodes, B. Segre pointed out that this was wrong; for example, for degree 6 the maximum number of nodes is 65, achieved by the Barth sextic, which is more than the maximum of 52 claimed by Severi.
- Rokhlin invariant. Rokhlin incorrectly claimed in 1951 that the third stable stem of the homotopy groups of spheres is of order 12. In 1952 he discovered his error: it is in fact cyclic of order 24. The difference is crucial as it results in the existence of the Rokhlin invariant, a fundamental tool in the theory of 3- and 4-dimensional manifolds.
- In 1961, Jan-Erik Roos published an incorrect theorem about the vanishing of the first derived functor of the inverse limit functor under certain general conditions. However, in 2002, Amnon Neeman constructed a counterexample. Roos showed in 2006 that the theorem holds if one adds the assumption that the category has a set of generators.
- The Schur multiplier of the Mathieu group M_{22} is particularly notorious as it was miscalculated more than once: Burgoyne & Fong (1966) first claimed it had order 3, then in a 1968 correction claimed it had order 6; its order is in fact (currently believed to be) 12. This caused an error in the title of Janko's paper A new finite simple group of order 86,775,570,046,077,562,880 which possesses M_{24} and the full covering group of M_{22} as subgroup on J4: it does not have the full covering group as a subgroup, as the full covering group is larger than was realized at the time.
- The original statement of the classification of N-groups by Thompson in 1968 accidentally omitted the Tits group, though he soon fixed this.
- In 1975, Leitzel, Madan, and Queen incorrectly claimed that there are only 7 function fields over finite fields with genus > 0 and class number 1, but in 2013 Stirpe found another; there are in fact exactly 8.
- Busemann–Petty problem. Zhang published two papers in the Annals of Mathematics in 1994 and 1999, in the first of which he proved that the Busemann–Petty problem in R^{4} has a negative solution, and in the second of which he proved that it has a positive solution.
- Algebraic stacks. The book Laumon & Moret-Bailly (2000) on algebraic stacks mistakenly claimed that morphisms of algebraic stacks induce morphisms of lisse-étale topoi. The results depending on this were repaired by Olsson (2007).

== Theories proven inconsistent ==
- Frege's foundations of mathematics in his 1879 book Begriffsschrift turned out to be inconsistent because of Russell's paradox, found in 1901.
- Church's original published attempt in 1932 to define a formal system was inconsistent, as was his correction in 1933. The consistent part of his system later became the lambda calculus.
- Quine published his original description of the system Mathematical Logic in 1940, but in 1942 Rosser showed it was inconsistent. Wang found a correction in 1950; the consistency of this revised system is still unclear.
- In 1967 Reinhardt proposed Reinhardt cardinals, which Kunen showed to be inconsistent with ZFC in 1971, though they are not known to be inconsistent with ZF.
- Per Martin-Löf's original version of intuitionistic type theory proposed in 1971 was shown to be inconsistent by Jean-Yves Girard in 1972, and was replaced by a corrected version.

== Status unclear ==
- Uniform convergence. In his Cours d'Analyse of 1821, Cauchy "proved" that if a sum of continuous functions converges pointwise, then its limit is also continuous. However, Abel observed in 1826 that this is not the case. For the conclusion to hold, "pointwise convergence" must be replaced with "uniform convergence". It is not entirely clear that Cauchy's original result was wrong, because his definition of pointwise convergence was a little vague and may have been stronger than the one currently in use, and there are ways to interpret his result so that it is correct. There are many counterexamples using the standard definition of pointwise convergence. For example, a Fourier series of sine and cosine functions, all continuous, may converge pointwise to a discontinuous function such as a step function.
- Carmichael's totient function conjecture was stated as a theorem by Robert Daniel Carmichael in 1907, but in 1922 he pointed out that his proof was incomplete. As of 2016 the problem is still open.
- Italian school of algebraic geometry. Most gaps in proofs are caused either by a subtle technical oversight, or before the 20th century by a lack of precise definitions. A major exception to this is the Italian school of algebraic geometry in the first half of the 20th century, where lower standards of rigor gradually became acceptable. The result was that there are many papers in this area where the proofs are incomplete, or the theorems are not stated precisely. This list contains a few representative examples, where the result was not just incompletely proved but also hopelessly wrong.
- In 1933 George David Birkhoff and Waldemar Joseph Trjitzinsky published a very general theorem on the asymptotics of sequences satisfying linear recurrences. The theorem was popularized by Jet Wimp and Doron Zeilberger in 1985. However, while the result is probably true, as of now (2021) Birkhoff and Trjitzinsky's proof is not generally accepted by experts, and the theorem is (acceptedly) proved only in special cases.
- A strengthening of Hilbert's sixteenth problem asking whether there exists a uniform finite upper bound for the number of limit cycles of planar polynomial vector fields of given degree n. In the 1950s, Evgenii Landis and Ivan Petrovsky published a purported solution, but it was shown wrong in the early 1960s.
- In 1954 Zarankiewicz claimed to have solved Turán's brick factory problem about the crossing number of complete bipartite graphs, but Kainen and Ringel later noticed a gap in his proof.
- Complex structures on the 6-sphere. In 1969 Alfred Adler published a paper in the American Journal of Mathematics claiming that the 6-sphere has no complex structure. His argument was incomplete, and this is (as of 2016) still a major open problem.
- Closed geodesics. In 1978 Wilhelm Klingenberg published a proof that smooth compact manifolds without boundary have infinitely many closed geodesics. His proof was controversial, and there is currently (as of 2016) no consensus on whether his proof is complete.
- In 1991, Kapranov and Voevodsky published a paper claiming to prove a version of the homotopy hypothesis. Later, Simpson showed the result of the paper is not true but conjectured that a variant of the result might be true, the variant now known as the Simpson conjecture.
- Telescope conjecture. Ravenel announced a refutation of this in 1992, but later withdrew it, and the conjecture is still open.
- Matroid bundles. In 2003 Daniel Biss published a paper in the Annals of Mathematics claiming to show that matroid bundles are equivalent to real vector bundles, but in 2009 published a correction pointing out a serious gap in the proof. His correction was based on a 2007 paper by Mnëv.
- In 2012, the Japanese mathematician Shinichi Mochizuki released online a series of papers in which he claims to prove the abc conjecture. Despite the publication in a peer-reviewed journal later, his proof has not been accepted as correct in the mainstream mathematical community.

== See also ==
- Pseudomathematics
- List of long mathematical proofs
- List of disproved mathematical ideas
- Superseded theories in science
