= Prime geodesic =

Type of curve in geometry

In mathematics, a prime geodesic on a hyperbolic surface is a primitive closed geodesic: one whose parametrization is not obtained by going repeatedly around a shorter closed geodesic. Informally, one follows the geodesic until its motion begins to repeat; the geodesic is prime if this first full return already completes the entire cycle, rather than repeating a shorter cycle several times. For comparison, a great circle on a sphere traversed once is analogous to a prime geodesic, whereas the same great circle traversed twice is not. Prime geodesics play, for hyperbolic surfaces, a role analogous to that of prime numbers in number theory: every closed geodesic is obtained by iterating a prime geodesic, and their asymptotic distribution is described by the prime geodesic theorem.

== Definition ==
Let $X$ be a hyperbolic surface. A closed geodesic $\gamma$ on $X$ is called prime or primitive if it is not an iterate $\gamma_0^n$ of another closed geodesic $\gamma_0$ with $n \ge 2$. Equivalently, a closed geodesic is prime if it traverses its image exactly once.

Every closed geodesic on a hyperbolic surface is an iterate of a unique prime geodesic.

Note: A geodesic is not considered closed merely because its image crosses itself. To be closed, it must return to its starting point with the same tangent direction; prime geodesics are those closed geodesics for which this first return is not itself a repetition of a shorter closed geodesic.

== Relation with Fuchsian groups ==
If $X = \Gamma \backslash \mathbb{H}$ is a hyperbolic surface presented as a quotient of the hyperbolic plane by a Fuchsian group $\Gamma \subset \mathrm{PSL}(2,\mathbb{R})$, then each hyperbolic element of $\Gamma$ has an invariant geodesic in $\mathbb{H}$, called its axis. The projection of this axis to $X$ is a closed geodesic.

With the usual conventions, this gives a correspondence between closed geodesics on $X$ and conjugacy classes of hyperbolic elements of $\Gamma$. Under this correspondence, prime geodesics are exactly the conjugacy classes represented by primitive hyperbolic elements, that is, elements that are not nontrivial powers of other elements of $\Gamma$.

If $P$ is a prime geodesic of length $\ell(P)$, its norm is usually defined by

$$N(P)=e^{\ell(P)}.$$

This normalization is standard in statements of the prime geodesic theorem and in the definition of the Selberg zeta function.

== Prime geodesic theorem ==
Let

$$\pi_X(x)=\#\{P : P \text{ is a prime geodesic on } X,\ N(P)\le x\}.$$

For a finite-area hyperbolic surface, the prime geodesic theorem states that

$$\pi_X(x)\sim \frac{x}{\log x}\qquad (x\to\infty).$$

Equivalently, the number of prime geodesics of length at most $L$ is asymptotic to $e^L/L$ as $L\to\infty$.

This theorem is an analogue of the prime number theorem. More refined versions include error terms, weighted counting functions analogous to the Chebyshev function, and arithmetic refinements for special surfaces such as the modular surface.

== Selberg zeta function ==
Prime geodesics enter the theory of hyperbolic surfaces through the Selberg zeta function, an Euler product taken over prime geodesics:

$$Z_X(s)=\prod_{P}\prod_{k=0}^{\infty}\left(1-N(P)^{-s-k}\right),$$

where $P$ ranges over the prime geodesics on $X$.

The analytic properties of $Z_X(s)$ are closely related to spectral data of the Laplace–Beltrami operator on the surface, and the prime geodesic theorem can be proved using this relationship together with the Selberg trace formula.

== Generalizations ==
The analogy between prime numbers and primitive closed orbits extends beyond constant-curvature surfaces. For geodesic flows on compact manifolds of negative curvature, asymptotic formulas for primitive closed geodesics were established by Grigory Margulis, and later developed in the broader setting of hyperbolic dynamical systems.

In a broader Riemannian and dynamical systems context, the term prime geodesic is also used for a closed geodesic that is not an iterate of a shorter one, even when the surface is not hyperbolic.

== See also ==
- Zoll surface
