= Laura Ortíz-Bobadilla =

Mexican mathematician

Laura Ortíz-Bobadilla is a Mexican mathematician specializing in differential geometry, and especially on holomorphic foliations and the limit cycles of dynamical systems. She is a researcher in the Institute of Mathematics of the National Autonomous University of Mexico (UNAM).

== Education and career ==
Ortíz-Bobadilla is originally from Mexico City. She studied mathematics at UNAM, earning bachelor's and master's degrees under the mentorship of José Antonio Seade Kuri and Xavier Gómez-Mont, respectively. She completed a PhD in 1991 at the Steklov Institute of Mathematics in Moscow, Russia; her dissertation, Analytic Classification of Complex Linear Vector Fields: Case of Nontrivial Jordan Cell, was supervised by Yulij Ilyashenko.

She has been a researcher in the Institute of Mathematics since 1992.

== Book ==
With Xavier Gómez-Mont, Ortíz-Bobadilla is the author of a Spanish-language textbook on dynamic systems on surfaces, Sistemas dinámicos holomorfos en superficies.

== Recognition ==
Ortíz-Bobadilla is a member of the Mexican Academy of Sciences. In 2020, UNAM gave her their National University Award for Teaching in the Exact Sciences.
