= Schnirelmann =

Schnirelmann is a surname. Notable people with the surname include:

- Lev Schnirelmann (1905–1938), Soviet mathematician
- Victor Schnirelmann (born 1949), Russian historian
