= Lyusternik–Fet theorem =

Mathematical theorem

In mathematics, the Lyusternik–Fet theorem states that on every compact Riemannian manifold there exists a closed geodesic. It is named after Lazar Lyusternik and Abram Ilyich Fet, who published it in 1951.
