= Dulac =

Dulac can refer to:

== People ==
- Bill DuLac, American football player
- Catherine Dulac, a professor for molecular biology
- Edmund Dulac, French book illustrator
- Germaine Dulac, French film director and early film theorist
- Henri Dulac, French mathematician

== Places ==
- Dulac, Louisiana, United States

== See also ==
- Duloc, the kingdom formerly ruled by Lord Farquaad in the Shrek film series
