= Mary Catherine Lamb =

American artist (1949–2009)

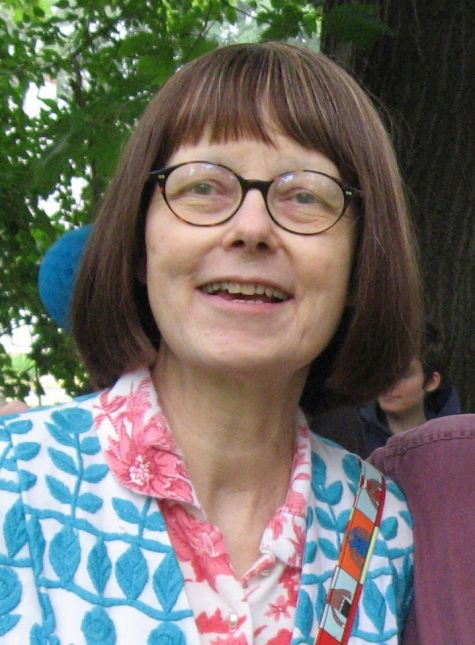
- Portrait of Mary Catherine Lamb one month before her death
- Born: March 12, 1949; Oakland, California
- Died: August 15, 2009 (aged 60); Portland, Oregon
- Spouse: Richard R. Daley (m.1971–1978, divorced)

Mary Catherine Lamb (March 12, 1949 – August 15, 2009) was an American textile artist, whose quilts reframed traditional Roman Catholic iconography. Recycling vintage textiles popular during the mid-20th century, she both honored and affectionately skewered her Catholic upbringing.

== Early life and education ==
Mary Catherine Lamb, known as "MC" to her friends, was born March 12, 1949, in Oakland, California, into a devoutly Catholic family. Her only sibling, Colette, was born three years later. Lamb read voraciously as a child, a habit she continued all her life, and also kept a journal that by the time of her death ran to 22 volumes, filled with elaborate illustrations.

The Lamb sisters both attended St. Leo the Great Catholic School in Oakland, then went on to Oakland's Holy Names High School. MC graduated in 1967 and attended Merritt College in Oakland the following year. She left the Catholic church when she moved away from home to attend college. In 1971, she married Richard Daley, a finish carpenter, and moved with him in 1972 to Portland, Oregon. They divorced in 1978.

== Quilting ==
Clearing out the family home in Oakland after her mother's death in 1986, Lamb rediscovered religious objects of her girlhood. She described being struck anew by the holy cards given to young Catholic children, and though long separated from the Catholic faith, she felt a resurgence of affection for these tokens of her childhood, recalling "the sense of promise, of security that the pictures of saints and angels imparted." "I found a lot of Catholic mementos that really stirred me," she said years later. "It was a revelation to me to realize I could embrace the images in a completely different way, on my own terms. It could incorporate playfulness and irreverence. But it also has a little bit of grief and yearning for the security of the past." "While maintaining my decades-long rejection of the Church, I found that rather than feeling the old rebellious anger I’d long held for these images, I savored the intensity of nostalgia they stimulated. The irony inherent in these parallel responses didn’t escape me," she said. Before long, choosing wall quilts as her medium, she would find herself drawn to "domestic textiles from the time when I believed and found comfort in the myths and symbols of the Catholic pantheon."

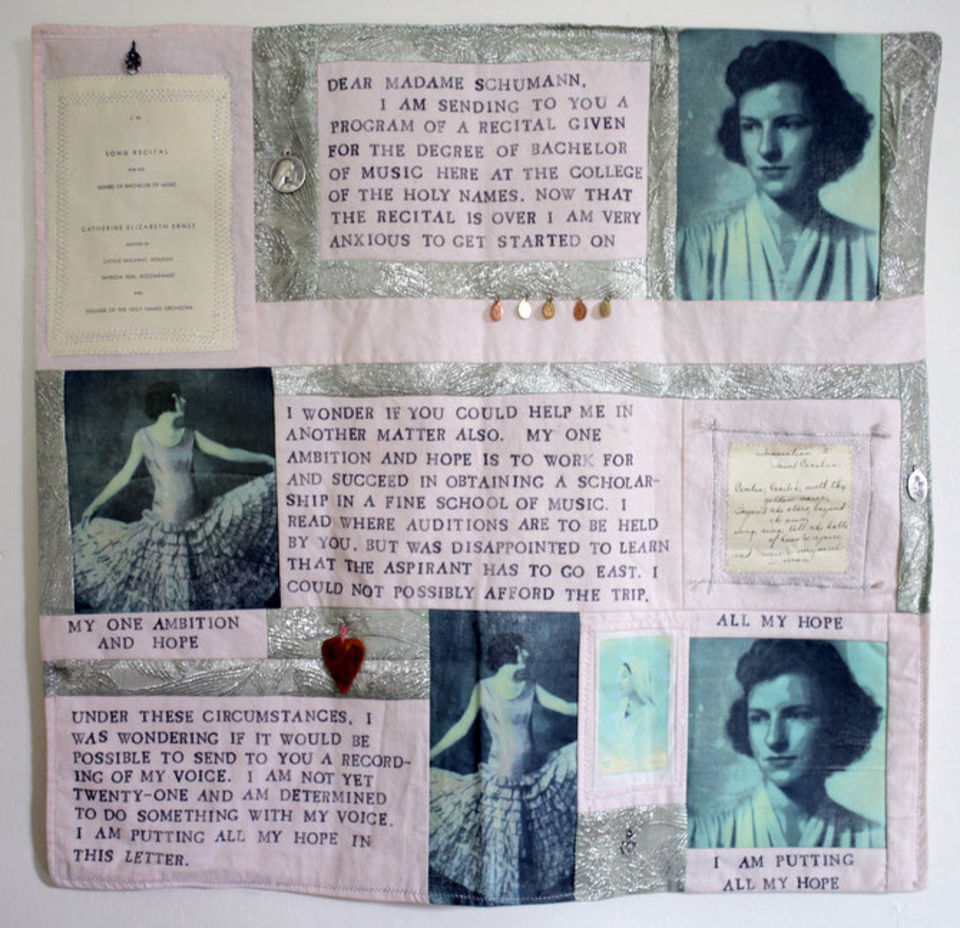
"All My Hope" quilt by Mary Catherine Lamb, 1987

Around the time her mother died, Lamb enrolled in an art class at Marylhurst College taught by Portland art photographer Christopher Rauschenberg and multimedia artist Susan Banyas; the class explored the possibilities of translating life events into art. One of her first projects was All My Hope, a small quilt honoring her mother who, despite youthful dreams of a singing career, instead became a social worker. Rauschenberg was immediately impressed by her work: "I thought she was a terrific artist, thought her work was really great."

Cootie Quilt was the first quilt Lamb made that really felt like it was more than following an assignment, she said. "All the fabrics in it are cut-up draperies or dishtowels or tablecloths. And I like how these cooties are funny in a way. I mean they’re comical, but they also have this kind of outer-space, menacing aspect. And it also got me started on the idea of doing a series of quilts based on the shapes of old toys."

In common with many traditional and contemporary quiltmakers, Lamb constructed her quilts with secondhand fabrics, "anticipating the recycled-art movement," as one critic put it. In time, she would become known for her eccentric choices of materials in creating "wry narratives that blended Christian symbolism with social comment," her multileveled pictorial quilts "at once innocent and troubling, reverent and irreverent, serious and tongue-in cheek." Lamb's first "religious" quilts impressed Rauschenberg by "the level of her craft, her vision, dealing with the religious imagery that can be traumatizing." He became a friend who championed and promoted her work throughout the rest of her life and after her death.

In an unpublished artist's statement, Lamb described her inspiration for the "religious" quilts: "I thought of creating a Byzantine-like depiction of the Virgin Mary... the solemnity tempered by the unlikely combination of homely secondhand household fabrics and lush metallic. It seemed a revelation to me that I could embrace the imagery in my own way, and delight in it...I didn't have to reject the beauty of the compelling, magic, historical images of the saints and angels just because I intellectually reject the dogma of the powerful institution for which these lovely images are symbols." She began using iron-on heat transfers of photographic images, a decision she described as "partly as a solution to drawing (or painting or embroidering or appliquéing) a believable face, but I was so struck by the almost eerie degree of humanity it lent to the piece that I have continued to rely on this method's power."

Like generations of quilt makers before her, Lamb used a familiar block construction process. She began with a full size drawing of one or multiple images she wanted to include – then broke down the original composition into "essentially abstract units, unreadable by themselves," which would eventually "coalesce into the narrative only when pieced together." Individual blocks completed, she would deliberately "fracture" the pieces so that they didn't fit neatly together, ultimately disjointing the images. For Saint Anthony’s Torment, for example, a few squares were given a quarter-turn before being attached to the neighboring squares. A few other squares were completely transposed, their positions switched entirely. The process helped "to exaggerate the kinetic sense of these ‘moving pictures,’" the artist’s deliberate disjuncts in pattern alignment "introduc[ing] both motion and the notion of deconstruction of the subject." In Saint Anthony's Torment, the viewer sees "an individual struggling to maintain his concentration in the face of diabolical distraction, clinging to faith and sanity while everything is spinning apart."

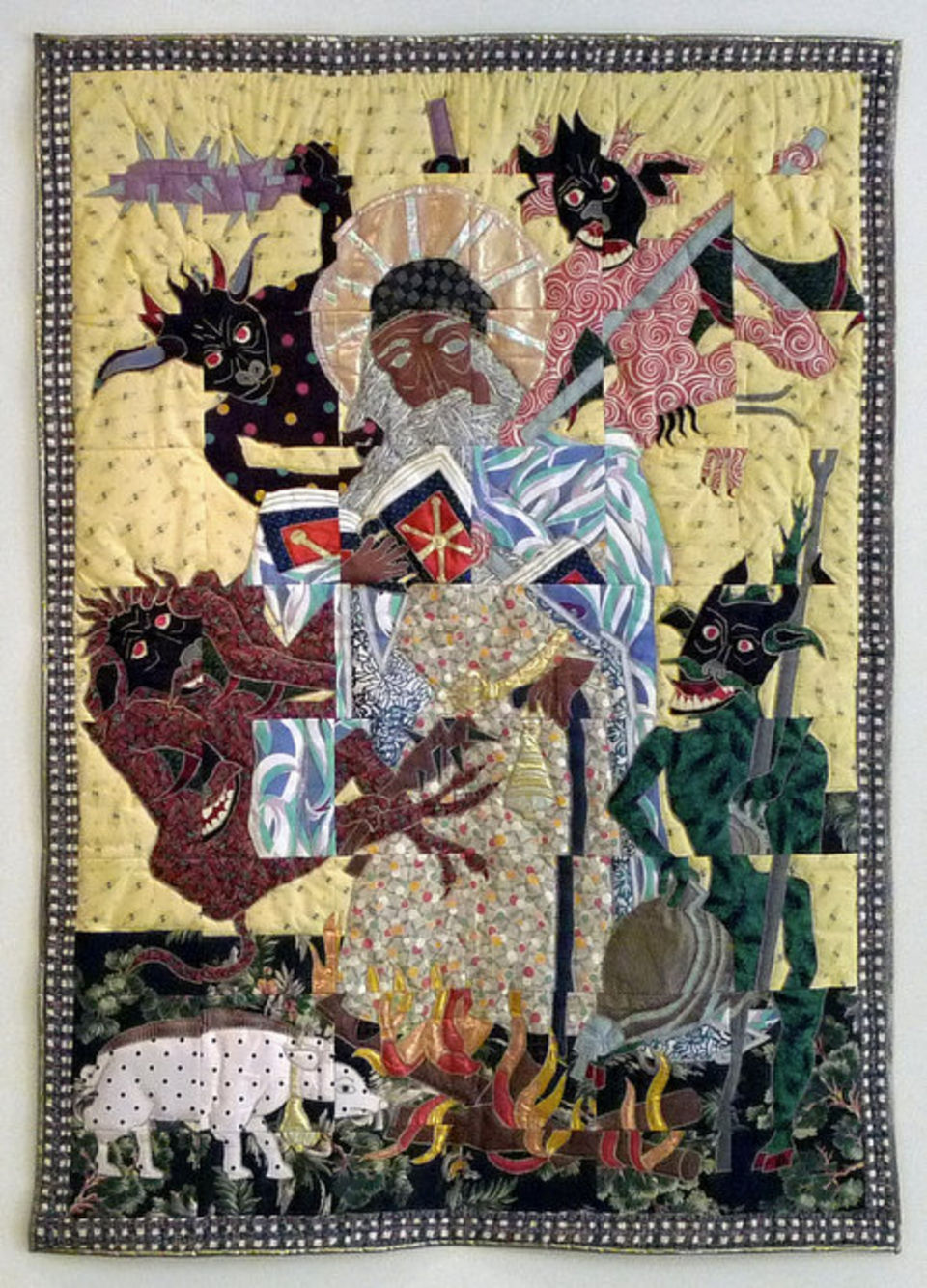
"Saint Anthony's Torment" quilt by Mary Catherine Lamb

Lamb drew particular inspiration from the Book of Kells, an illuminated Gospel book believed to have been created c. 800 AD, whose illustrations embellished traditional Christian iconography with ornate, swirling motifs. "I became enamored of medieval depictions of these stories," she wrote. "[T]he flat, graphic quality of illuminated manuscripts . . . made them well suited for reinterpretation with two-dimensional textile work." Rummaging through Portland's garage sales and thrift stores, Lamb emerged with raw materials, treasures to her thinking: cast-off mid-20th century curtains, tablecloths and garments. These discarded fabrics would continue to reinforce memories of her Catholic childhood, "when certain religious images conveyed to me unquestioned order of the universe – with fond amusement not unlike my feelings for the holy cards themselves." Among the silks, satins, brocades and metallics she gathered were "some hideous things I’d rather be shot in the foot than wear." Some of her quilts were also festooned with found elements like seashells, buttons, sequins, fake pearls, old coins, bugle beads, and subway tokens. For Lamb, vintage cocktail dresses from the 1950s also exuded an "air of regal elegance like that of gilded medieval renditions of sacred subjects." "As a skeptical adult, I conjure up these images with a mixture of yearning and irony," she said. "I also find humor in the transformations (tablecloth into mantle, skirt into halo) and hope the viewer does [too.]" Using these fabrics "previously worn or otherwise lived with lends a whisper of anonymous experience, a shimmer of life, to the whole...For me, the spiritual aspect comes from the lives these fabrics lived. These fabrics have soaked up experience that we’ll never know about," she wrote. Whether eliciting memories of common Catholic childhoods, or an instant, startling sense of déjà vu, many viewers felt an immediate connection with the quilts and the "range of emotional experience that was once played out in the presence of the reconfigured pieces of damask, cotton, satin, and corduroy," castoffs hinting of unknown lives, "the ordinary . . . infused with the numinous," she said.

Studying quiltmaking at the Oregon College of Art and Craft (OCAC), Lamb was aware of America's studio quilt art movement born in the mid-1960s. As did several better-known art quiltmakers unknown to her, she "worked with pictorial images and approached design holistically, as a painter would." Robert Shaw, renowned quilt curator, historian and author, met and befriended Lamb early on, featuring two of her quilts in his influential 1997 book, The Art Quilt. Michael James, internationally-known, pioneering quilt artist and author (now chair of the University of Nebraska–Lincoln Department of Textiles, Merchandising and Fashion Design), was another who quickly recognized Lamb's unique blend of the sacred and profane, and wrote about her.

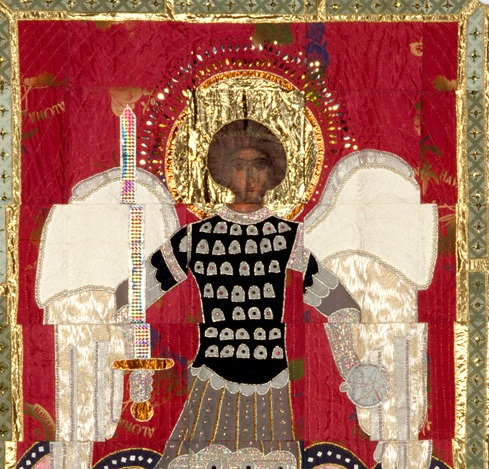
Detail from "The Archangel Michael Bids You Aloha" quilt by Mary Catherine Lamb

Regarding the question of why Lamb's work wasn't better known during her lifetime, Carolyn Ducey, curator at the International Quilt Study Center & Museum, noted that "Lamb was not concerned with [marketing her work]. She was more wrapped up in doing the work." Further, Lamb's irreverent religious content may have distanced some exhibition jury members. After her death, Michael James assessed Lamb's stature in the studio quilt world as "At the top...She was one of the originals."

== Exhibitions ==
Lamb was a member of Portland's Blackfish Gallery, the country's longest-running cooperative gallery, from 1993 through 1998, and was subsequently invited to join Nine Gallery, co-founded by nine artists, including Rauschenberg. Over the years her quilts were displayed in both galleries, in solo shows as well as in exhibitions with fellow member artists. During her lifetime, her quilts were exhibited not only regionally but also around the U.S. and the world, including galleries and museums in Pittsburgh, Atlanta, New Orleans, Oberlin, Tennessee, France, and the Czech Republic. From 1999-2001, her Angel at the Tomb hung in the residence of the American Ambassador to Turkmenistan, part of the U.S. State Department Art in the Embassies cultural exchange program. Currently, Lamb's Cootie Quilt is in the collection of the Renwick Gallery (a branch of the Smithsonian American Art Museum), Michael the Archangel Bids You Aloha is in the collection of the Portland Art Museum, and Our Lady of Perpetual Garage Sales is in the collection of the Pacific Northwest College of Art's Center for Contemporary Art and Culture. The International Quilt Study Center & Museum owns fourteen of Lamb's quilts through donation or direct purchase, and in 2015 held an exhibition titled Medieval Imagery in the Quilts of Mary Catherine Lamb.

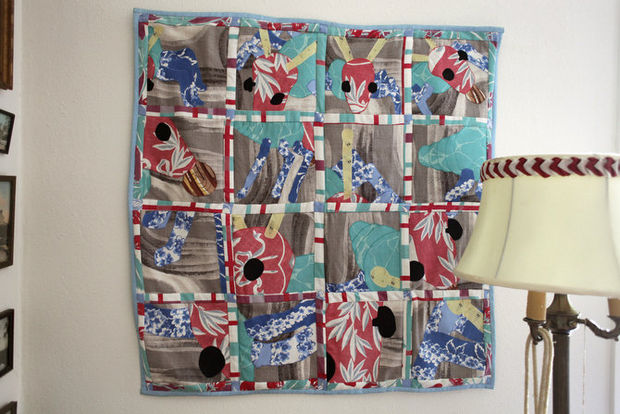
"Cootie Quilt" by Mary Catherine Lamb, displayed in her home

== Personal life and community activism ==
Mary Catherine Lamb arrived in Portland in 1972 and found the city to be suitably politically liberal and a mecca for artists and writers. She quickly attracted a group of loyal friends who called themselves "MC's Tribe" and stuck with her through the end. A wonderful host, she loved celebrations and rituals and was eager to find any excuse to indulge in them. Her "hard-core" monthly poker games, held in her home, had one admission requirement: the guest must be able "to contribute to discussions of life, culture and current events." A movie fanatic, she gathered her women friends for semi-monthly movie outings. The rules: no popcorn during the film, no standing up until the credits were through.

Lamb was known for her sense of humour, and also drawn to precision, which was also a component of her artistry. She was known to dislike improper grammar and punctuation, and to maintain a level of courtesy and formality outside of her work. Examples of this include sending thank-you notes immediately, setting her table with appropriate china and crystal, and showing good manners. Joan Harvey, writing for The Oregonian, notes:

[She] was meticulous. She did everything with the utmost precision, care and thoroughness. She had to be precise to be a quilter, and... [she] was a quilter like no other.

Lamb's income derived from an ever-changing patchwork of part-time jobs. She worked as a night-shift dishwasher at a restaurant and a clerk at the Multnomah County Library. She wrote and edited for technical firms and also worked as a copy editor for several Pacific Northwest publications, including Glimmer Train, Left Bank, Eighth Mountain Press, Mississippi Mud, and Willamette Week, the city's alternative newspaper. A spin-off from her frequent trips to thrift stores and garage sales was a successful eBay store she called "A Prize Every Time," from which she sold carefully selected vintage clothing.

An inheritance from her mother's 1986 death allowed her to become more financially secure. She left her library job but continued copy editing. While continuing to study quiltmaking at the Oregon School of Art and Craft, she was able to focus more on her art studies at Marylhurst. The Marylhurst degree, a Bachelor of Fine Arts, was awarded in 1992.

Off work, in the spirit of her "hippie days" in the Bay Area, Lamb threw herself into a variety of liberal causes. While at the library, she helped organize its first labor union. Volunteering for community radio station KBOO-FM led to hosting "Women Reading Women," a semi-monthly program spotlighting fiction written by women. In 1992, she vigorously opposed Ballot Measure 9, an anti-gay measure on the Oregon ballot. Five years later, she joined OPB Watch, a committee opposing the elimination of most of the music programming on Oregon Public Broadcasting, and in 2002, organized a letter-writing campaign against shutting down the 127-year-old post office in Portland's Pioneer Courthouse.

== Buckman house ==
In 1990, Lamb purchased a century-old, ten-room, three-story house in Portland's Buckman neighborhood, to house her growing collection of cultural miscellanea. It became, as Robert Shaw described it, an "amazing house . . . a very personal museum of things she loved."

The Buckman house were known to offered visitors a whimsical, arresting array of quirky collections. Dozens of sock monkeys used to lined the window seat of her bedroom. The bathroom walls displayed assorted paint-by-number pictures. Bright cotton handkerchiefs were pinned high on a wall like colorful little flags. Women's gloves, no two alike, made a valance across the bedroom window. Chinese checkerboards covered one wall. A small, serene figure of The Virgin of Guadalupe presided over the living room, guarded by a ring of plastic cootie toys. Elsewhere, other religious statuettes, holy cards, paintings and prayer books were arranged in abundance, a collection that, like her quilts, "both honors and affectionately skewers my Catholic upbringing," she said. Spread throughout the house were many vignettes, seemingly-disparate objects juxtaposed, underscoring both their uniqueness and common spirit. The third floor was her studio space, shelves and drawers housing hundreds of pieces of vintage fabric and other oddments, raw material for the quilts she pieced with a vintage Singer sewing machine.

On the steps leading up from the sidewalk, painted wooden crutches served as balustrades, and brightly hued bowling balls defined the periphery of the front porch. Lavishly illustrated articles about the house appeared in regional newspapers, including the Oregonian, the Portland Tribune, and at least one national magazine, including Budget Living.

== Death ==
When Lamb was first diagnosed with breast cancer in 2004, "MC’s Tribe" gathered around her, bringing food and company to her house. Five years later, as plans were being made to celebrate the cancer's official remission, it returned with a vengeance, this time attacking her liver and then her brain. The Tribe, now eighty-plus strong, again rose to the occasion, raising funds for her care, taking turns providing meals, and simply keeping her company. She died at age 60, on August 15, 2009, her sister Colette having nursed her through her last days. To the end, she was rushing to complete a commission for Rauschenberg: a quilt commemorating his father, the artist Robert Rauschenberg, who had died the previous year. Her October memorial service, held in Portland's Tiffany Center, was attended by "a couple of hundred" of her friends.

After Lamb's death, Rauschenberg took detailed photographs of the Buckman house, documenting its rooms and their contents. The results, along with Susan Seubert's photos for Budget Living, were published in a book titled Mary Catherine Lamb’s House. The home was sold and the hundreds of items Lamb had meticulously amassed and arranged throughout her home were distributed among The Tribe.
