= Resurgence =

Resurgence may refer to:

- Resurgence (spring), a spring discharge, where water comes from the ground
- Resurgence (pest) of (usually agricultural) pests
- Resurgence (Dutch Revolt), the period between 1572 and 1585 in the Dutch Revolt
- Risorgimento, meaning the Resurgence, Italian unification
- The Resurgence (organization), a Christian ministry associated with Mars Hill Church and Mark Driscoll
- Resurgence, an Atlanta United supporters' group
- Resurgence theory, the mathematical theory of resurgent functions, used to sum divergent series

== Media ==
- Resurgence!, a 1981 album by David "Fathead" Newman
- Resurgence (magazine), a British publication, merged with The Ecologist in 2012
- Resurgence (novel), a 2002 novel by Charles Sheffield
- Resurgence (C. J. Cherryh novel), a 2020 novel by C. J. Cherryh
- Anti-Semitism in the 21st Century: The Resurgence, a 2007 documentary film
- Independence Day: Resurgence, a 2016 American film
