= Jean Écalle =

French mathematician (born 1947)

Jean Écalle (born 1947) is a French mathematician, specializing in dynamic systems, perturbation theory, and analysis.

Écalle received, in 1974 from the University of Paris-Saclay in Orsay, a doctorate under the supervision of Hubert Delange with Thèse d'État entitled La théorie des invariants holomorphes. He is a directeur de recherche (senior researcher) of the Centre national de la recherche scientifique (CNRS) and is a professor at the University of Paris-Saclay.

He developed a theory of so-called "resurgent functions", analytic functions with isolated singularities, which have a special algebra of derivatives (Alien calculus, Calcul différentiel étranger). "Resurgent functions" are divergent power series whose Borel transforms converge in a neighborhood of the origin and give rise, by means of analytic continuation, to (usually) multi-valued functions, but these multi-valued functions have merely isolated singularities without singularities that form cuts with dimension one or greater. Écalle's theory has important applications to solutions of generalizations of Abel's integral equation; the method of resurgent functions provides for such solutions a (Borel) resummation method for dealing with divergent series arising from semiclassical asymptotic developments in quantum theory.

He applied his theory to dynamic systems and to the interplay between diophantine small denominators and resonance involved in problems of germs of vector fields.

Independently of Yulij Ilyashenko he proved that the number of limit cycles of polynomial vector fields in the plane is finite, which Henri Dulac had already tried to prove in 1923. This result is related to Hilbert's sixteenth problem.

In 1988 Écalle was the inaugural recipient of the Prix Mergier-Bourdeix of the Académie des Sciences. He was in 1990 an Invited Speaker at International Congress of Mathematicians in Kyoto.

== Selected publications ==
- Les Fonctions Résurgentes , 3 volumes, pub. Math. Orsay, 1985 (downloadable pdf's available here)
- Cinq applications des fonctions résurgentes , pub. Math. Orsay 1984
- Singularities non abordables par la géométrie , Annales Inst. Fourier, 42, 1992, 73-164 doi:10.5802/aif.1287
- "Six Lectures on Transseries, Analytical Functions and the Constructive Proof of Dulac's Conjecture", in D. Schlomiuk's Bifurcations and Periodic Orbits of Vector Fields, Kluwer 1993, 75-184 doi:10.1007/978-94-015-8238-4_3
- with B. Vallet: Correction and linearization of resonant vector fields or diffeomorphisms, Mathematische Zeitschrift 229, 1998, pp. 249–318 doi:10.1007/PL00004655
- "A Tale of Three Structures: The Arithmetic of Multizetas, the Analysis of Singularities, the Lie Algebra ARI", in BLJ Braaksma, GK Immink, Marius van der Put, J. Top (eds.) Differential Equations and the Stokes Phenomenon, World Scientific 2002, pp. 89–146 doi:10.1142/9789812776549_0006
- Recent Advances in the Analysis of Divergence and Singularities, in C. Rousseau, Yu. Ilyashenko (Editor) Proceedings of the July 2002 Montreal Seminar on Bifurcation, Normal Forms and Finite Problems in Differential Equations, Kluwer 2004, pp. 87–187 abstract
- Théorie des invariants holomorphes , Pub. Math. Orsay 1974
- Introduction aux fonctions analysables et preuve constructive de la conjecture de Dulac , Paris: Hermann 1992
- with Olivier Bouillot: "Invariants of identity-tangent diffeomorphisms: explicit formulae and effective computation." arXiv preprint arXiv:1404.1042 (2014).
