= Håkan Eliasson =

Swedish mathematician

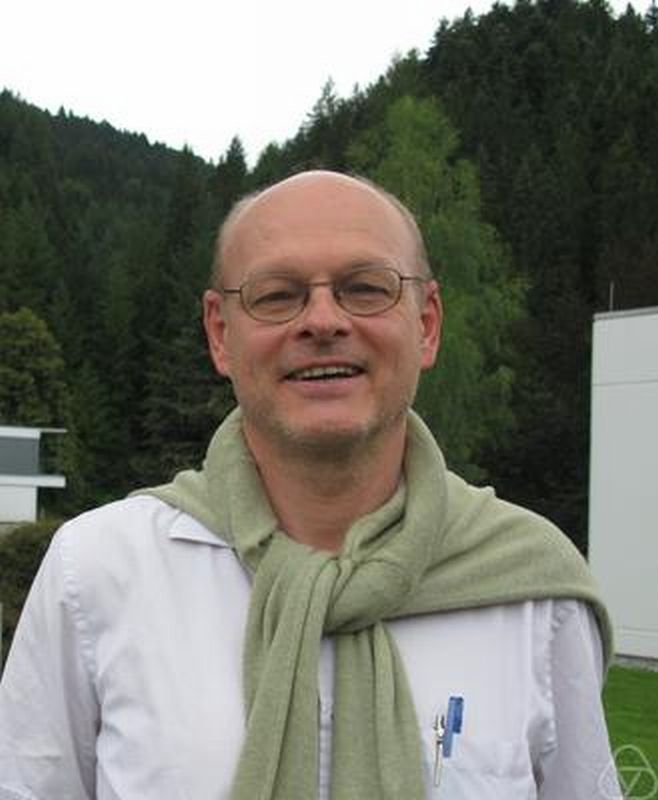
Eliasson at Oberwolfach in 2011

Lars Håkan Eliasson (born 13 July 1952) is a Swedish mathematician.

== Biography ==
Eliasson received in 1984 his PhD from the Stockholm University under Jürgen Moser with thesis Hamiltonian systems with Poisson commuting integrals. He was a professor at the Royal Institute of Technology in Stockholm and then became a professor at the University of Paris VII (Denis Diderot) and the Institut de mathématiques de Jussieu of the Universities Paris VI and VII and the CNRS.

His research deals with dynamical systems, quasiperiodic motion, the problem of small denominators in perturbation theory, the KAM Theory and multiscale analysis in perturbation theory, Hamiltonian partial differential equations, and localization and diffusion in quasiperiodic Schrödinger operators.

In 1998 he was an Invited Speaker at the International Congress of Mathematicians in Berlin. In 2005 and in 2012 he was at the Institute for Advanced Study.

In 1990 he received the Wallenberg Prize from the Swedish Mathematical Society, 1995 he received the Salem Prize, 2007 he received the Eva & Lars Gårding Prize in Mathematics and 2008 he received the Sophie Germain Prize.

He was at the editorial committee of Acta Mathematica 2012–2017.

== Selected publications ==
- "Perturbations of stable invariant tori for Hamiltonian systems" (PDF). Annali della Scuola Normale Superiore di Pisa-Classe di Scienze. 15 (1): 115–147. 1988.
- Eliasson, L. H. (1990). "Normal forms for Hamiltonian systems with Poisson commuting integrals—elliptic case". Commentarii Mathematici Helvetici. 65 (1): 4–35. doi:10.1007/bf02566590. S2CID 121360821.
- Eliasson, L. H. (1992). "Floquet solutions for the 1-dimensional quasi-periodic Schrödinger equation". Communications in Mathematical Physics. 146 (3): 447–482. Bibcode:1992CMaPh.146..447E. doi:10.1007/bf02097013. S2CID 121224461.
- Eliasson, L. H. (1997). "Discrete one-dimensional quasi-periodic Schrödinger operators with pure point spectrum". Acta Mathematica. 179 (2): 153–196. doi:10.1007/bf02392742.
- with Sergei Kuksin: Eliasson, L. Hakan; Kuksin, Sergei (2010). "KAM for the nonlinear Schrödinger equation". Annals of Mathematics. 172: 371–435. arXiv:0709.2393. doi:10.4007/annals.2010.172.371.
