= Paul Funk =

Austrian mathematician

Paul Georg Funk (14 April 1886, Vienna – 3 June 1969, Vienna) was an Austrian mathematician who introduced the Funk transform and who worked on the calculus of variations.

== Biography ==
Born in Vienna in 1886, Paul Funk was the son of a deputy bank manager and went to high school in Baden and Gmunden. Then, studied mathematics in Tübingen, Vienna, and Göttingen, writing his PhD dissertation (Über Flächen mit lauter geschlossenen geodätischen Linien, 'On surfaces with many closed geodesic lines') under the supervision of David Hilbert.

He got his PhD in 1911 and spent the interwar years (1915-1939) in Prague as Professor of Mathematics at the Deutsche Technische Hochschule Prag. He became an associate professor in 1921 and a professor in 1927.

Suspended from his professorship in 1939 on account of his being Jewish, Funk was deported to the Theresienstadt concentration camp in 1944, where he spent the last months of the war. He was freed in 1945 and became professor at TU Wien.

He died in Vienna on 3 June, 1969. He was buried at Neustift Cemetery.

== Major publications ==
- Funk, Paul (1962), Variationsrechnung und ihre Anwendung in Physik und Technik, Die Grundlehren der mathematischen Wissenschaften (in German), vol. 94, Berlin, New York: Springer-Verlag, ISBN 978-3-540-04830-5, MR 0152914
