= Sergei B. Kuksin =

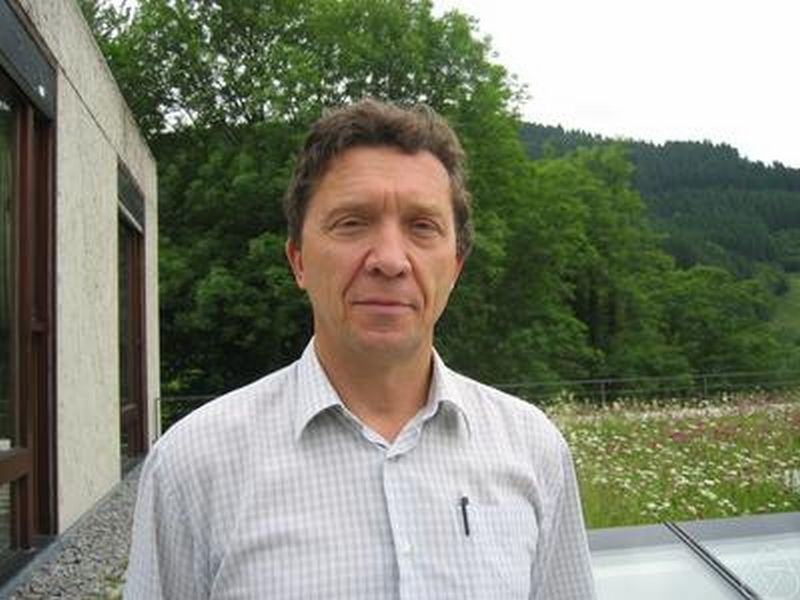
Sergei Kuksin, Oberwolfach 2008

Sergei Borisovich Kuksin (Сергей Борисович Куксин, born 2 March 1955) is a French and Russian mathematician, specializing in partial differential equations (PDEs).

Kuksin received his doctorate under the supervision of Mark Vishik at Moscow State University in 1981. He was at the Steklov Institute in Moscow and at the Heriot-Watt University and is a directeur de recherché (senior researcher) at the Institut Mathématiques de Jussieu of the Paris Diderot University (Paris VII).

His research deals with KAM theory in partial differential equations (i.e. infinite dimensional Hamiltonian systems); partial differential equations involved with random perturbations, turbulence and statistical hydrodynamics; and elliptic PDEs for functions between compact manifolds.

In 1992 he was an invited speaker with talk KAM theory for partial differential equations at the European Congress of European Mathematicians in Paris. In 1998 he was an invited speaker at International Congress of Mathematicians in Berlin. In 2016 he received the Lyapunov Prize from the Russian Academy of Sciences.

== Selected publications ==
=== Articles ===
- Hamiltonian perturbations of infinite-dimensional linear systems with an imaginary spectrum, Functional Analysis and Applications, Vol. 21, 1987, pp. 192–205 doi:10.1007/BF02577134
- with Jürgen Pöschel: Invariant Cantor manifolds of quasi-periodic oscillations for a nonlinear Schrödinger equation, Annals of Mathematics, Vol. 143, 1996, pp. 149–179 doi:10.2307/2118656
- A KAM-theorem for equations of the Korteweg-de Vries type, Rev. Math. Phys., Vol. 10, 1998, pp. 1–64
- with Armen Shirikyan: Stochastic Dissipative PDE's and Gibbs measures, Communications in Mathematical Physics, Vol. 213, 2000, pp. 291–330 doi:10.1007/s002200000237
- with A. Shirikyan: A Coupling Approach to Randomly Forced Nonlinear PDEs. I, Communications in Mathematical Physics, Vol. 221, 2001, pp. 351–366 doi:10.1007/s002200100479
- with A. Shirikyan: Ergodicity for the randomly forced 2D Navier-Stokes equations, Mathematical Physics, Analysis and Geometry, Vol. 4, 2001, pp. 147–195 doi:10.1023/A:1011989910997
- with Håkan Eliasson: KAM for the nonlinear Schrödinger equation, Annals of Mathematics, Vol. 188, 2010, pp. 371–435 JSTOR 20752272

=== Books ===
- Nearly Integrable Infinite-Dimensional Hamiltonian Systems, Lecture Notes in Mathematics 1556, Springer 1993
- Analysis of Hamiltonian PDEs, Clarendon Press, Oxford 2000
- with A. Shirkyan: Mathematics of two-dimensional turbulence, Cambridge University Press 2012
