= Bendixson–Dulac theorem =

Mathematical theory on dynamical systems

In mathematics, the Bendixson–Dulac theorem is a theorem in dynamical systems that exclude the existence of periodic orbits of two-dimensional flows. Here a flow can be visualized as the surface of a pond. If you drop a leaf into a pond, it will drift according to the currents in the water, and a periodic orbit is when the leaf returns to the same place. Roughly speaking, the theorem states that if it is possible to distort the field of currents by stretching and compressing the pond like a rubber sheet, in such a way that the flow is either always expanding or always contracting, then there is no periodic orbit.

Formally, the theorem asserts that if there exists a $C^1$ function $\varphi(x, y)$ (called the Dulac function) such that the expression

According to Dulac theorem any 2D autonomous system with a periodic orbit has a region with positive and a region with negative divergence inside such orbit. Here represented by red and green regions respectively

$$\frac{ \partial (\varphi f) }{ \partial x } + \frac{ \partial (\varphi g) }{ \partial y }$$

has the same sign ($\neq 0$) almost everywhere in a simply connected region of the plane, then the plane autonomous system

$$\frac{ dx }{ dt } = f(x,y),$$

$$\frac{ dy }{ dt } = g(x,y)$$

has no nonconstant periodic solutions lying entirely within the region. "Almost everywhere" means everywhere except possibly in a set of measure 0, such as a point or line.

The theorem was first established by Swedish mathematician Ivar Bendixson in 1901 and further refined by French mathematician Henri Dulac in 1923 using Green's theorem.

== Proof ==
Without loss of generality, let there exist a function $\varphi(x, y)$ such that

$$\frac { \partial (\varphi f) }{ \partial x } +\frac { \partial (\varphi g) }{ \partial y } >0$$

in simply connected region $R$. Let $C$ be a closed trajectory of the plane autonomous system in $R$, meaning $f(t+T,x,y) = f(t,x,y)$ and $g(t+T,x,y) = g(t,x,y)$ for all $t \geq 0$ and some $T > 0$ on the curve $C$. Let $D$ be the interior of $C$. Then by Green's theorem,

$$\begin{align}
& \iint_D \left( \frac { \partial (\varphi f) }{ \partial x } +\frac { \partial (\varphi g) }{ \partial y }  \right) \,dx\,dy
=\iint_D \left( \frac { \partial (\varphi \dot { x }) }{ \partial x } +\frac { \partial (\varphi \dot { y }) }{ \partial y }  \right) \,dx\,dy \\[6pt]
= {} & \oint_C \varphi \left( -\dot { y } \,dx+\dot { x } \,dy\right)
=\oint_C \varphi \left( -\dot { y }\dot { x }+\dot { x }\dot { y }\right)\,dt=0
\end{align}$$

with $\dot{x}=dx/dt$ and $\dot{y}=dy/dt$ being Newton's notation and the first equality following from the plane autonomous system. Because of the constant sign, the left-hand integral in the previous line must evaluate to a positive number. But on $C$, $dx=\dot { x } \,dt$ and $dy=\dot { y } \,dt$, so the bottom integrand is in fact 0 everywhere and for this reason the right-hand integral evaluates to 0. This is a contradiction, so there can be no such closed trajectory $C$.

== See also ==
- Limit cycle § Finding limit cycles
- Liouville's theorem (Hamiltonian), similar theorem with $\frac{ dq }{ dt } =\frac{\partial H(q,p)}{\partial p}\, (=f(q,p)), \frac{ dp }{ dt } =-\frac{\partial H(q,p)}{\partial q}\, (=g(q,p))$
