= Nikolai Luzin =

Russian mathematician

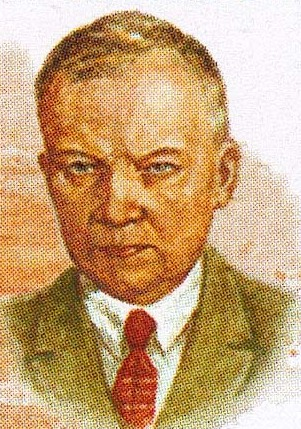
- Born: 9 December 1883; Irkutsk, Russian Empire
- Died: 28 February 1950 (aged 66); Moscow, Russian SFSR, Soviet Union
- Citizenship: Russian Empire; Soviet Union
- Education: Moscow State University
- Known for: Contributions to descriptive set theory, mathematical analysis, point-set topology; Luzin's theorem, Lusin spaces, Luzin sets;
- Scientific career
- Fields: Mathematician
- Workplaces: Moscow State University; Steklov Mathematical Institute; Polytechnical Institute Ivanovo-Voznesensk
- Thesis: The Integral and Trigonometric Series (1915)
- Doctoral advisor: Dmitri Egorov
- Doctoral students: Pavel Alexandrov; Nina Bari; Aleksandr Khinchin; Andrey Kolmogorov; Alexander Kronrod; Mikhail Lavrentyev; Alexey Lyapunov; Lazar Lyusternik; Pyotr Novikov; Lev Schnirelmann; Pavel Urysohn

Nikolai Nikolayevich Luzin (also spelled Lusin; Russian: Никола́й Никола́евич Лу́зин, IPA: [nʲɪkɐˈlaj nʲɪkɐˈlajɪvʲɪtɕ ˈluzʲɪn]; 9 December 1883 – 28 February 1950) was a Soviet and Russian mathematician known for his work in descriptive set theory and aspects of mathematical analysis with strong connections to point-set topology. He was the eponym of Luzitania, a loose group of young Moscow mathematicians of the first half of the 1920s. They adopted his set-theoretic orientation, and went on to apply it in other areas of mathematics.

== Life ==
He started studying mathematics in 1901 at Moscow State University, where his advisor was Dmitri Egorov. He graduated in 1905.

Luzin underwent great personal turmoil in the years 1905 and 1906, when his materialistic worldview had collapsed and he found himself close to suicide. In 1906 he wrote to Pavel Florensky, a former fellow mathematics student who was now studying theology: You found me a mere child at the University, knowing nothing. I don't know how it happened, but I cannot be satisfied any more with analytic functions and Taylor series ... it happened about a year ago. ... To see the misery of people, to see the torment of life, to wend my way home from a mathematical meeting ... where, shivering in the cold, some women stand waiting in vain for dinner purchased with horror - this is an unbearable sight. It is unbearable, having seen this, to calmly study (in fact to enjoy) science. After that I could not study only mathematics, and I wanted to transfer to the medical school. The correspondence between the two men continued for many years and Luzin was greatly influenced by Florensky's religious treatise The Pillar and Foundation of Truth (1908).

From 1910 to 1914 Luzin studied at Göttingen, where he was influenced by Edmund Landau. He then returned to Moscow and received his Ph.D. degree in 1915. During the Russian Civil War (1918–1920) Luzin left Moscow for the Polytechnical Institute Ivanovo-Voznesensk (now called Ivanovo State University of Chemistry and Technology). He returned to Moscow in 1920.

In the 1920s Luzin organized a famous research seminar at Moscow State University. His doctoral students included some of the most famous Soviet mathematicians: Pavel Alexandrov, Nina Bari, Aleksandr Khinchin, Andrey Kolmogorov, Aleksandr Kronrod, Mikhail Lavrentyev, Alexey Lyapunov, Lazar Lyusternik, Pyotr Novikov, Lev Schnirelmann and Pavel Urysohn.

On 5 January 1927 Luzin was elected as a corresponding member of the Academy of Sciences of the Soviet Union and became a full member of the Academy of Sciences of the Soviet Union first at the Department of Philosophy and then at the Department of Pure Mathematics (12 January 1929). In 1929 he was elected as a member of the Polish Academy of Sciences and Letters in Kraków.

== Research work ==
Luzin's first significant result was a construction of an almost everywhere divergent trigonometric series with monotonic convergence to zero coefficients (1912). This example disproved the Pierre Fatou conjecture and was unexpected to most mathematicians at that time.

At approximately the same time, he proved what is now called Lusin's theorem in real analysis.

His Ph.D. thesis titled Integral and trigonometric series (1915) had a large impact on the subsequent development of the metric theory of functions. A set of problems formulated in this thesis for a long time attracted attention from mathematicians. For example, the first problem in the list, on the convergence of the Fourier series for a square-integrable function, came to be called Luzin's conjecture and was solved by Lennart Carleson in 1966 (Carleson's theorem).

In the theory of boundary properties of analytic functions he proved an important result on the invariance of sets of boundary points under conformal mappings (1919).

Luzin was one of the founders of descriptive set theory. Together with his student Mikhail Suslin, he developed the theory of analytic sets.

He also made contributions to complex analysis, the theory of differential equations, and numerical methods.

=== Letter to Vygodsky ===
In a letter to M. Ya. Vygodsky dating from 1932, Luzin expresses sympathy with Vygodsky's infinitesimal approach to developing calculus. He mocks accusations of bourgeois decadence against Vygodsky's textbook, and relates his own youthful experience with what he felt were unnecessary formal complications of the traditional development of analysis. Typical is his youthful reaction to his teachers' insistence that the derivative is a limit: "They won't fool me: it's simply the ratio of infinitesimals, nothing else." A recent study notes that Luzin's letter contained remarkable anticipations of modern calculus with infinitesimals.

== Luzin affair of 1936 ==
On 21 November 1930, the declaration of the "initiative group" of the Moscow Mathematical Society which consisted of Luzin's former students Lazar Lyusternik and Lev Schnirelmann along with Alexander Gelfond and Lev Pontryagin claimed that "there appeared active counter-revolutionaries among mathematicians". Some of these mathematicians were pointed out, including the advisor of Luzin, Dmitri Egorov. In September 1930, Egorov was arrested on the basis of his religious beliefs. He then left the position of director of the Moscow Mathematical Society and was replaced by Ernst Kolman. As a result, Luzin left the Moscow Mathematical Society and Moscow State University. Egorov died on 10 September 1931, after a hunger strike initiated in prison. In 1931, Kolman brought the first complaint against Luzin.

In 1936 the Great Purge began. Millions of people were arrested or executed, including leading members of the intelligentsia. In July–August of that year, Luzin was criticized in Pravda in a series of anonymous articles whose authorship later was attributed to Kolman. It was alleged that Luzin published "would-be scientific papers", "felt no shame in declaring the discoveries of his students to be his own achievements", and stood close to the ideology of the "black hundreds", orthodoxy, and monarchy "fascist-type modernized but slightly." One of the complaints was that he published his major results in foreign journals.

The article triggered a special hearing on Luzin's case by the Commission of the Academy of Sciences of the Soviet Union, where the allegations were reviewed and formalized. At the hearing, Alexandrov, Lyusternik, Khinchin, Kolmogorov and some other students of Luzin accused him of plagiarism from Pyotr Novikov and Mikhail Suslin and various forms of misconduct, which included denying promotions to Kolmogorov and Khinchin. According to some researchers, Alexandrov and Kolmogorov had been involved in a homosexual relationship in the 1930s, a fact the police used to pressure them into testifying against their former teacher. Sergei Sobolev, Gleb Krzhizhanovsky and Otto Schmidt incriminated Luzin with charges of disloyalty to Soviet power. The methods of political insinuations and slander had been used against the old Muscovite professorship already several years before the article in Pravda.

The hearings were completed in five sessions between July 7, 1936, and July 15, 1936, and people testifying, as well as the nature of accusations, changed from one session to another. In the initial session, the accusations were separated into accusations of scientific misconduct, which included plagiarism; accusations of professional misconduct, which mostly involved accusations of nepotism in promotions and reviews; and political accusations, which were the most serious. The initial review on July 7, which most prominently featured Alexandrov and Kolmogorov, concluded in a warning to Luzin regarding plagiarism while stressing the overall importance of his work, cleared him politically, yet recommended to relieve him of administrative duties.

However, this outcome did not seem to satisfy the instigators of the case, so that from the second hearing on, the nature of accusations shifted: now the primary focus was that Luzin published his papers extensively in France rather than in Soviet journals, and his pre-Soviet sympathies were brought to the forefront.

The special hearing of the Commission of the Academy of Sciences of the Soviet Union endorsed all accusations of Luzin as an "enemy under the mask of a Soviet citizen." Although the Commission convicted Luzin, he was neither expelled from the academy nor arrested, but his department in the Steklov Institute was closed and he lost all his official positions. There has been some speculation about why his punishment was so much milder than that of most other people condemned at that time, but the reason for this does not seem to be known for certain. Historian of mathematics Adolph P. Yushkevich speculated that at the time, Stalin was more concerned with the forthcoming Moscow trials of Lev Kamenev, Grigory Zinoviev and others, whereas the eventual fate of Luzin was of a little interest to him.

The 1936 decision of the Academy of Sciences was not canceled after Stalin's death. The decision was finally reversed on January 17, 2012.

== Honors ==
In 1976, Martian crater Luzin was named in his honor.

== Bibliography ==
- Luzin, N. N. (1931). Two letters by N. N. Luzin to M. Ya. Vygodskii. With an introduction by S. S. Demidov. Translated from the 1997 Russian original by Abe Shenitzer. The American Mathematical Monthly 107 (2000), no. 1, 64–82. JSTOR 2589382

== See also ==
- Denjoy–Luzin theorem
- Denjoy–Luzin–Saks theorem
- Lusin's theorem
- Luzin space
