= Selberg trace formula =

Mathematical theorem

In mathematics, the Selberg trace formula, introduced by Selberg (1956), is an expression for the character of the unitary representation of a Lie group G on the space L^{2}(Γ\G) of square-integrable functions, where Γ is a cofinite discrete group. The character is given by the trace of certain functions on G.

The simplest case is when Γ is cocompact, when the representation breaks up into discrete summands. Here the trace formula is an extension of the Frobenius formula for the character of an induced representation of finite groups. When Γ is the cocompact subgroup Z of the real numbers G = R, the Selberg trace formula is essentially the Poisson summation formula.

The case when Γ\G is not compact is harder, because there is a continuous spectrum, described using Eisenstein series. Selberg worked out the non-compact case when G is the group SL(2, R); the extension to higher rank groups is the Arthur–Selberg trace formula.

When Γ is the fundamental group of a Riemann surface, the Selberg trace formula describes the spectrum of differential operators such as the Laplacian in terms of geometric data involving the lengths of geodesics on the Riemann surface. In this case the Selberg trace formula is formally similar to the explicit formulas relating the zeros of the Riemann zeta function to prime numbers, with the zeta zeros corresponding to eigenvalues of the Laplacian, and the primes corresponding to geodesics. Motivated by the analogy, Selberg introduced the Selberg zeta function of a Riemann surface, whose analytic properties are encoded by the Selberg trace formula.

== Early history ==
Cases of particular interest include those for which the space is a compact Riemann surface S. The initial publication in 1956 of Atle Selberg dealt with this case, its Laplacian differential operator and its powers. The traces of powers of a Laplacian can be used to define the Selberg zeta function. The interest in this case was the analogy between the formula obtained and the explicit formulas of prime number theory. Here the closed geodesics on S play the role of prime numbers.

At the same time, interest in the traces of Hecke operators was linked to the Eichler–Selberg trace formula, of Selberg and Martin Eichler, for a Hecke operator acting on a vector space of cusp forms of a given weight, for a given congruence subgroup of the modular group. Here the trace of the identity operator is the dimension of the vector space, i.e. the dimension of the space of modular forms of a given type: a quantity traditionally calculated by means of the Riemann–Roch theorem.

== Applications ==
The trace formula has applications to arithmetic geometry, analytic number theory, spectral geometry, and the theory of automorphic forms. In the case of hyperbolic surfaces, it translates information about the spectrum of the Laplace–Beltrami operator into geometric information about closed geodesics, and conversely.

By suitable choices of the test function, the trace formula yields asymptotic information about eigenvalues of the Laplacian, including Weyl-type asymptotics. For compact hyperbolic surfaces it also shows that the Laplace spectrum determines the length spectrum of closed geodesics, so the lengths of primitive closed geodesics are spectral invariants.

The analogy between the Selberg trace formula and the explicit formulas of prime number theory leads to the prime geodesic theorem, which counts primitive closed geodesics, or equivalently primitive hyperbolic conjugacy classes, by length or norm. The trace formula and the Selberg zeta function are standard tools in the proof of this theorem and in refinements of its error term.

For congruence subgroups, trace formulas are used to study automorphic forms and traces of Hecke operators. In the classical setting this includes the Eichler–Selberg trace formula, which gives formulas for traces of Hecke operators on spaces of cusp forms and, in particular cases, dimension formulas for spaces of modular forms. More generally, the trace formula is one of the basic tools in the spectral theory of automorphic forms and in analytic number theory.

The trace formula is also central to the analytic theory of the Selberg zeta function. It can be used to prove the meromorphic continuation and functional equation of the zeta function, and to relate its zeros to Laplace eigenvalues and to the geometry of closed geodesics.

== Selberg trace formula for compact hyperbolic surfaces ==
A compact hyperbolic surface X can be written as the space of orbits
$$\Gamma \backslash \mathbf{H},$$
where Γ is a subgroup of PSL(2, R), and H is the upper half plane, and Γ acts on H by linear fractional transformations.

The Selberg trace formula for this case is easier than the general case because the surface is compact so there is no continuous spectrum, and the group Γ has no parabolic or elliptic elements (other than the identity).

Then the spectrum for the Laplace–Beltrami operator on X is discrete and real, since the Laplace operator is self adjoint with compact resolvent; that is
$$0 = \mu_0 < \mu_1 \leq \mu_2 \leq \cdots$$
where the eigenvalues μ_{n} correspond to Γ-invariant eigenfunctions u in C^{∞}(H) of the Laplacian; in other words
$$\begin{cases}
u(\gamma z) = u(z), \qquad \forall \gamma \in \Gamma \\
y^2 \left (u_{xx} + u_{yy} \right) + \mu_{n} u = 0.
\end{cases}$$

Using the variable substitution
$$\mu = s(1-s), \qquad  s=\tfrac{1}{2}+ir$$
the eigenvalues are labeled
$$r_{n}, n \geq 0.$$

Then the Selberg trace formula is given by
$$\sum_{n=0}^\infty h(r_n) =  \frac{\mu(X)}{4 \pi } \int_{-\infty}^\infty r \, h(r) \tanh(\pi r)\,dr  +  \sum_{ \{T\} } \frac{ \log N(T_0) }{ N(T)^{\frac{1}{2}} - N(T)^{-\frac{1}{2}} } g(\log N(T)).$$

The right hand side is a sum over conjugacy classes of the group Γ, with the first term corresponding to the identity element and the remaining terms forming a sum over the other conjugacy classes {T } (which are all hyperbolic in this case). The function h has to satisfy the following:

- be analytic on |Im(r)| ≤ 1/2 + δ;
- h(−r) = h(r);
- there exist positive constants δ and M such that:
  $$\vert h(r) \vert \leq M \left( 1+\left| \operatorname{Re}(r) \right| \right )^{-2-\delta}.$$

The function g is the Fourier transform of h, that is,
$$h(r) = \int_{-\infty}^\infty g(u) e^{iru} \, du.$$

== The general Selberg trace formula for cocompact quotients ==
=== General statement ===
Let G be a unimodular locally compact group, and $\Gamma$ a discrete cocompact subgroup of G and $\phi$ a compactly supported continuous function on G. The trace formula in this setting is the following equality:
$$\sum_{\gamma\in\{\Gamma\}} a_\Gamma^G(\gamma)\int_{G^\gamma\setminus G}\phi(x^{-1}\gamma x)\,dx = \sum_{\pi\in\widehat G}a_\Gamma^G(\pi)\operatorname{tr}\pi(\phi)$$
where $\{\Gamma\}$ is the set of conjugacy classes in $\Gamma$, $\widehat G$ is the unitary dual of G and:

- for an element $\gamma \in \Gamma$, $a_\Gamma^G(\gamma) = \text{volume}(\Gamma^\gamma\setminus G^\gamma)$ with $G^\gamma, \Gamma^\gamma$ the centralisers of $\gamma$ in $G,\Gamma$ respectively;
- for an irreducible unitary representation $\pi$ of $G$, $a_\Gamma^G(\pi)$ is the multiplicity of $\pi$ in the right-representation on $\Gamma\backslash G$ in $L^2(\Gamma\backslash G$), and $\pi(\phi)$ is the operator $\int_G \phi(g)\pi(g) dg$;
- all integrals and volumes are taken with respect to the Haar measure on $G$ or its quotients.

The left-hand side of the formula is called the geometric side and the right-hand side the spectral side. The terms $\int_{G^\gamma\setminus G}\phi(x^{-1}\gamma x)\,dx$ are orbital integrals.

=== Proof ===
Define the following operator on compactly supported functions on $\Gamma\backslash G$:
$$R(\phi) = \int_G \phi(x)R(x)\,dx.$$
It extends continuously to $L^2(\Gamma\setminus G)$ and for $f\in L^2(\Gamma\setminus G)$ we have:
$$(R(\phi)f)(x) = \int_G\phi(y)f(xy)\,dy = \int_{\Gamma\setminus G}\left(\sum_{\gamma\in\Gamma}\phi(x^{-1}\gamma y)\right)f(y)\,dy$$
after a change of variables. Assuming $\Gamma\setminus G$ is compact, the operator $R(\phi)$ is trace-class and the trace formula is the result of computing its trace in two ways as explained below.

The trace of $R(\phi)$can be expressed as the integral of the kernel $K(x,y)=\sum_{\gamma\in\Gamma}\phi(x^{-1}\gamma y)$ along the diagonal, that is:
$$\operatorname{tr}R(\phi) = \int_{\Gamma\setminus G}\sum_{\gamma\in\Gamma}\phi(x^{-1}\gamma x)\,dx.$$
Let $\{\Gamma\}$ denote a collection of representatives of conjugacy classes in $\Gamma$, and $\Gamma^\gamma$ and $G^\gamma$ the respective centralizers of $\gamma$. Then the above integral can, after manipulation, be written
$$\operatorname{tr}R(\phi) = \sum_{\gamma\in\{\Gamma\}} a_\Gamma^G(\gamma)\int_{G^\gamma\setminus G}\phi(x^{-1}\gamma x)\,dx.$$
This gives the geometric side of the trace formula.

The spectral side of the trace formula comes from computing the trace of $R(\phi)$ using the decomposition of the regular representation of $G$ into its irreducible components. Thus
$$\operatorname{tr}R(\phi) = \sum_{\pi\in\hat G}a_\Gamma^G(\pi)\operatorname{tr}\pi(\phi)$$
where $\hat G$ is the set of irreducible unitary representations of $G$ (recall that the positive integer $a_\Gamma^G(\pi)$ is the multiplicity of $\pi$ in the unitary representation $R$ on $L^2(\Gamma\setminus G)$).

=== The case of semisimple Lie groups and symmetric spaces ===
When $G$ is a semisimple Lie group with a maximal compact subgroup $K$ and $X=G/K$ is the associated symmetric space the conjugacy classes in $\Gamma$ can be described in geometric terms using the compact Riemannian manifold (more generally orbifold) $\Gamma \backslash X$. The orbital integrals and the traces in irreducible summands can then be computed further and in particular one can recover the case of the trace formula for hyperbolic surfaces in this way.

== Later work ==
The general theory of Eisenstein series was largely motivated by the requirement to separate out the continuous spectrum, which is characteristic of the non-compact case.

The trace formula is often given for algebraic groups over the adeles rather than for Lie groups, because this makes the corresponding discrete subgroup Γ into an algebraic group over a field which is technically easier to work with. The case of SL_{2}(C) is discussed in Gel'fand, Graev & Pyatetskii-Shapiro (1990) and Elstrodt, Grunewald & Mennicke (1998). Gel'fand et al also treat SL_{2}(F) where F is a locally compact topological field with ultrametric norm, so a finite extension of the p-adic numbers Q_{p} or of the formal Laurent series F_{q}((T)); they also handle the adelic case in characteristic 0, combining all completions R and Q_{p} of the rational numbers Q.

Contemporary successors of the theory are the Arthur–Selberg trace formula applying to the case of general semisimple G, and the many studies of the trace formula in the Langlands philosophy (dealing with technical issues such as endoscopy). The Selberg trace formula can be derived from the Arthur–Selberg trace formula with some effort.

== See also ==
- Jacquet–Langlands correspondence
