= Theorem of the three geodesics =

Existence of geodesic circles on surfaces

In differential geometry the theorem of the three geodesics, also known as Lyusternik–Schnirelmann theorem, states that every Riemannian manifold with the topology of a sphere has at least three simple closed geodesics (i.e. three embedded geodesic circles). The result can also be extended to quasigeodesics on a convex polyhedron, and to closed geodesics of reversible Finsler 2-spheres. The theorem is sharp: although every Riemannian 2-sphere contains infinitely many distinct closed geodesics, only three of them are guaranteed to have no self-intersections. For example, by a result of Morse if the lengths of three principal axes of an ellipsoid are distinct, but sufficiently close to each other, then the ellipsoid has only three simple closed geodesics.

== History and proof ==
A triaxial ellipsoid and its three geodesics

A geodesic, on a Riemannian surface, is a curve that is locally straight at each of its points. On the Euclidean plane the geodesics are lines, and on a sphere the geodesics are great circles. The shortest path in the surface between two points is always a geodesic, but other geodesics may exist as well. A geodesic is said to be a closed geodesic if it returns to its starting point and starting direction; in doing so it may cross itself multiple times. The theorem of the three geodesics says that for surfaces homeomorphic to the sphere, there exist at least three non-self-crossing closed geodesics. There may be more than three; for instance, a sphere has infinitely many.

This result stems from the mathematics of ocean navigation, where the surface of the earth can be modeled accurately by an ellipsoid, and from the study of geodesics on an ellipsoid, the shortest paths for ships to travel. In particular, a nearly-spherical triaxial ellipsoid has only three simple closed geodesics, its equators. In 1905, Henri Poincaré conjectured that every smooth surface topologically equivalent to a sphere likewise contains at least three simple closed geodesics, and in 1929 Lazar Lyusternik and Lev Schnirelmann published a proof of the conjecture; while the general topological argument of the proof was correct, it employed a deformation result that was later found to be flawed. Several authors proposed unsatisfactory solutions of the gap. A universally accepted solution was provided in the 1980s by Grayson, following a suggestion of Karen Uhlenbeck, by means of the curve shortening flow.

== Generalizations for surfaces ==
A strengthened version of the theorem states that, on any Riemannian surface that is topologically a sphere, there necessarily exist three simple closed geodesics whose length is at most proportional to the diameter of the surface.

The number of closed geodesics of length at most L on a smooth topological sphere grows in proportion to L/log L, but not all such geodesics can be guaranteed to be simple.

On compact hyperbolic Riemann surfaces, there are infinitely many simple closed geodesics, but only finitely many with a given length bound. They are encoded analytically by the Selberg zeta function. The growth rate of the number of simple closed geodesics, as a function of their length, was investigated by Maryam Mirzakhani.

The existence of three simple closed geodesics also holds for any reversible Finsler metric on the 2-sphere.

== Generalizations for 3-spheres ==
In his famous problem list in 1982, Shing-Tung Yau posed the conjecture that every Riemannian 3-sphere contains at least 4 embedded minimal spheres. In 2023, Zhichao Wang and Xin Zhou proved Yau's conjecture for the case of generic metrics using the Simon-Smith min-max theory.

For minimal surfaces of non-zero genus, Brian White conjectured in 1989 that every 3-sphere contains at least 5 embedded minimal tori. In 2024, Adrian Chun-Pong Chu and Yangyang Li confirmed White's conjecture for metrics with positive Ricci curvature. In addition, Chu showed that in the positive Ricci case, every 3-sphere contains at least 1 minimal surface of genus g, for every g. Their proofs also rely on the Simon-Smith min-max theory.

== Non-smooth metrics ==
Unsolved problem in computer science
Is there an algorithm that can find a simple closed quasigeodesic on a convex polyhedron in polynomial time?
More unsolved problems in computer science

It is also possible to define geodesics on some surfaces that are not smooth everywhere, such as convex polyhedra. The surface of a convex polyhedron has a metric that is locally Euclidean except at the vertices of the polyhedron, and a curve that avoids the vertices is a geodesic if it follows straight line segments within each face of the polyhedron and stays straight across each polyhedron edge that it crosses. Although some polyhedra have simple closed geodesics (for instance, the regular tetrahedron and disphenoids have infinitely many closed geodesics, all simple) others do not. In particular, a simple closed geodesic of a convex polyhedron would necessarily bisect the total angular defect of the vertices, and almost all polyhedra do not have such bisectors.

Nevertheless, the theorem of the three geodesics can be extended to convex polyhedra by considering quasigeodesics, curves that are geodesic except at the vertices of the polyhedra and that have angles less than π on both sides at each vertex they cross. A version of the theorem of the three geodesics for convex polyhedra states that all polyhedra have at least three simple closed quasigeodesics; this can be proved by approximating the polyhedron by a smooth surface and applying the theorem of the three geodesics to this surface. It is an open problem whether any of these quasigeodesics can be constructed in polynomial time.
