= Mark Vishik =

Russian mathematician

- Марко Иосифович Вишик
- Born: 19 October 1921; Lwów, Poland (now Lviv, Ukraine)
- Died: 23 June 2012 (aged 90); Moscow, Russia
- Education: Tbilisi State University; Steklov Institute of Mathematics
- Spouse: Asya Guterman
- Awards: Member of Italian Academy of Sciences, Honorary Doctorate of Free University, Berlin
- Scientific career
- Fields: Partial Differential Equations
- Workplaces: Lomonosov University, Russian Academy of Sciences
- Theses: On the method of orthogonal projections for linear self-adjoint equations (1947); On systems of elliptic differential equations and on general boundary-value problems (1951)
- Doctoral advisor: Lazar Aronovich Lusternik
- Doctoral students: Sergei B. Kuksin; Mikhail Shubin

Mark Vishik (also Marko Vishik Russian: Марко Иосифович Вишик; 19 October 1921–23 June 2012) was a Poland-born Soviet and Russian mathematician who worked in the field of partial differential equations.

== Life and work ==
=== Lwów ===
In Lwów, Mark Vishik visited the fifth gymnasium (high school), which specialized in physics and mathematics. His mathematical talent was encouraged by a method of teaching, which left it up to the students to find mathematical proofs. He began studying mathematics at the University of Lviv in December 1939, at the time when the Lwów school mathematics was still active. Among his teachers were Juliusz Schauder, Stanisław Mazur, Bronislaw Knaster, and Edward Szpilrajn, who organized a student conference in 1940 in Lviv, also attended by Stefan Banach.

=== From Lwów to Tbilisi ===
In June 1941, during the occupation of Lwów the Germans, Vishik left the city with a Komsomol group. Vishik then joined the retreating army and on foot reached Ternopil and then Zhmerynka (in Vinnytsia) and in two more weeks got by means of a freight train to Kiev. After fleeing further to Krasnodar, Vishik passed Dniprodzerzhynsk and for two months helped with the harvest in Timashevsk.

He was a student at the pedagogical university in Krasnodar, but because of advancing German troops he then fled further to Makhachkala, where he studied for a year. He fell ill with malaria, but managed to hide on a military train in the fall of 1942 and reached Tbilisi. Vishik was already acquainted with Nikoloz Muskhelishvili, mathematician and president in 1941, founded the Georgian Academy of Sciences, whom he met during Muskhelishvili's visit to Lwów (probably in 1940) and was therefore ready to start studying in Tbilisi.

The Mathematical Institute was run by Ilia Vekua there were lectures by V. Kupradze. Vishik became friend with the number theorist Arnold Walfisz. After graduating in 1943, Vishik was advised by Walfisz, Gantmacher, and Muskhelishvili to go to Moscow to continue his studies.

=== Moscow ===
Since the spring of 1945, he studied in Moscow under the supervision of Lazar Lyusternik. On May 8, 1945 (V-E-Day), he met his future wife Asya Guterman. He received his doctorate in 1947 at the Steklov Institute of Mathematics, and defended his thesis under Ivan G. Petrovsky and Sergey L. Sobolev. His dissertation was a generalization of the work The method of orthogonal projection in potential theory by Hermann Weyl, which he read with no knowledge of English. From 1947 to 1965 he was assistant, and then, after his habilitation in 1951, a professor at the Moscow Power Engineering Institute.

Since 1965, Vishik was a professor at the Faculty of Mechanics and Mathematics, Moscow State University in Moscow. Since 1993 he conducted research at the Institute for Information Transmission Problems of the Russian Academy of Sciences. Vishik had 48 students and was the author of several books and more than 250 articles. His two sons, Mikhail and Simeon, are also mathematicians. Since 1961, he organized his seminar on Partial Differential Equations at Moscow State University.

Vishik's work has been exceptionally fruitful. For example, Jacques-Louis Lions and w:it:Enrico Magenes wrote a three-volume work on non-homogeneous boundary value problems, developing the work by Vishik and Sobolev from 1956.

== Awards ==
Mark Vishik was a member of the Italian Academy of Sciences since 1994. In 2001 he received an Honorary Doctorate from the Free University of Berlin.

== Seminar series ==
Vishik started his seminar at Moscow State University in the spring of 1961, at the suggestion of I. M. Gelfand. The seminar ran on Mondays in Room 13-06 of the main building of Moscow State University, starting at 18:00 (initially at 16:00) and lasting for several hours. It featured talks of many world class mathematicians from Russia, France, and other countries. Traditionally, the speakers of the seminars were guests at M. I. Vishik's apartment on the Sunday night, before the seminar. The seminar ran for more than 50 years, until Mark Vishik's death in June 2012.

Mark Iosifovich considered this seminar one of the main achievements of his life. This seminar collected the color of the mathematical community, and speaking at its meetings was considered a great honour.

== Monographs ==
- Dissertation: On the method of orthogonal projections for linear self-adjoint equations, 1947
- Habilitation: On systems of elliptic differential equations and on general boundary-value problems, 1951
- (With A.V. Fursikov): Mathematical Problems of Statistical Hydromechanics, Kluwer, 1988.
- (With A.V. Babin): Attractors of Evolution Equations, North-Holland, 1992 (Russisches Original 1989)
- Asymptotic Behaviour of Solutions of Evolutionary Equations, Cambridge University Press, 1993
- (Author and editor with A.V. Babin): Properties of Global Attractors of Partial Differential Equations, Advances in Soviet Mathematics (AMS), Volume 10, 1992 (anthology of four articles, two of Mark Vishik (with V.Y. Skvortsov))
- (With V.V. Chepyzhov): Attractors for Equations of Mathematical Physics (Colloquium Publications 49 (AMS)), 2002

== See also ==
- Séminaire Nicolas Bourbaki
- French mathematical seminars
