= Yulij Ilyashenko =

Russian mathematician (born 1943)

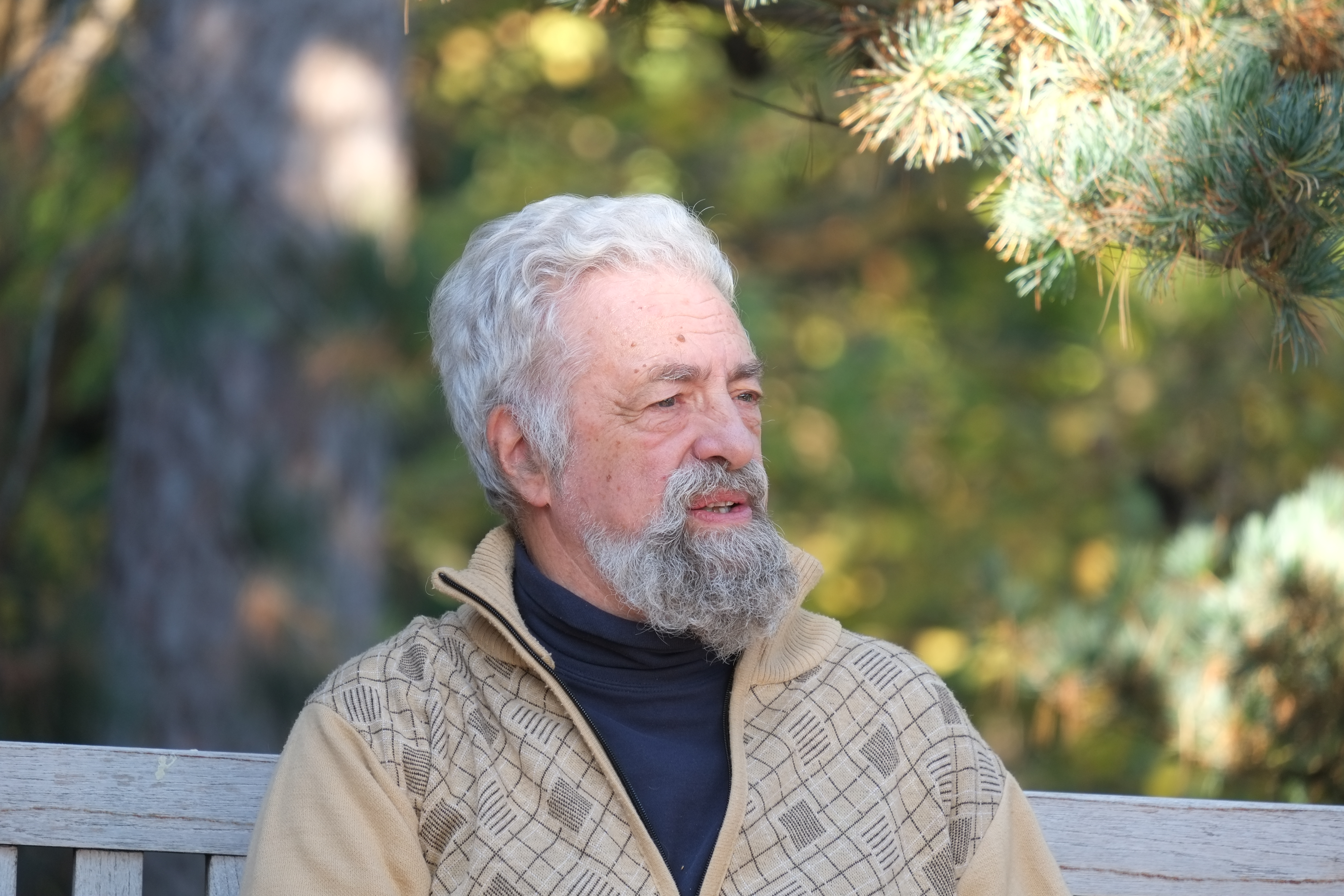
Ilyashenko in 2013

Yulij Sergeevich Ilyashenko (Russian: Юлий Сергеевич Ильяшенко; 4 November 1943) is a Russian mathematician, specializing in dynamical systems, differential equations, and complex foliations. He was born in Moscow.

Ilyashenko received in 1969 from Moscow State University his Russian candidate degree (Ph.D.) under Evgenii Landis and Vladimir Arnold. Ilyashenko was a professor at Moscow State University, an academic at Steklov Institute, and also taught at the Independent University of Moscow. He became a professor at Cornell University.

His research deals with, among other things, what he calls the "infinitesimal Hilbert's sixteenth problem", which asks what one can say about the number and location of the boundary cycles of planar polynomial vector fields. The problem is not yet completely solved. Ilyashenko attacked the problem using new techniques of complex analysis (such as functional cochains). He proved that planar polynomial vector fields have only finitely many limit cycles. Jean Écalle independently proved the same result, and an earlier attempted proof by Henri Dulac (in 1923) was shown to be defective by Ilyashenko in the 1970s.

He was an Invited Speaker of the ICM in 1978 at Helsinki and in 1990 with talk Finiteness theorems for limit cycles at Kyoto. In 2017 he was elected a Fellow of the American Mathematical Society.

== Selected publications ==
- Finiteness theorems for limit cycles, American Mathematical Society Translations, 1991 (also published in Russian Mathematical Surveys, 45, 1990, 143–200)
- with Weigu Li: Nonlocal Bifurcations, Mathematical Surveys and Monographs, AMS 1998
- with S. Yakovenko: Lectures on Analytic Differential Equations, AMS 2007 ISBN 978-0821836675
- as editor with Yakovenko: Concerning the Hilbert 16th Problem, AMS 1995
- as editor: Nonlinear Stokes Phenomena, Advances in Soviet Mathematics 14, AMS 1993
- as editor with Christiane Rousseau: Normal Forms, Bifurcations and Finiteness Problems in Differential Equations, Proceedings of a NATO seminar, Montreal, 2002, Kluwer, 2004
  - article by Ilyashenko: Selected topics in differential equations with real and complex time, 317–354
- with Anton Gorodetski: Certain new robust properties of invariant sets and attractors of dynamical systems, Functional Analysis and Applications, vol. 33, no. 2, 1999, pp. 16–32. doi:10.1007/BF02465190
- Ilyashenko, Yu (2000). "Hilbert-type numbers for Abel equations, growth and zeros of holomorphic functions". Nonlinearity. 13 (4): 1337. Bibcode:2000Nonli..13.1337I. doi:10.1088/0951-7715/13/4/319. S2CID 250887845.
- with G. Buzzard and S. Hruska: Kupka-Smale theorem for polynomial automorphisms of $C^2$ and persistence of heteroclinic intersections, Inventiones Mathematicae, vol. 161, 2005, pp. 45–89 doi:10.1007/s00222-004-0418-8

== See also ==
- Hilbert–Arnold problem
