= Zoll surface =

Surface homeomorphic to a sphere

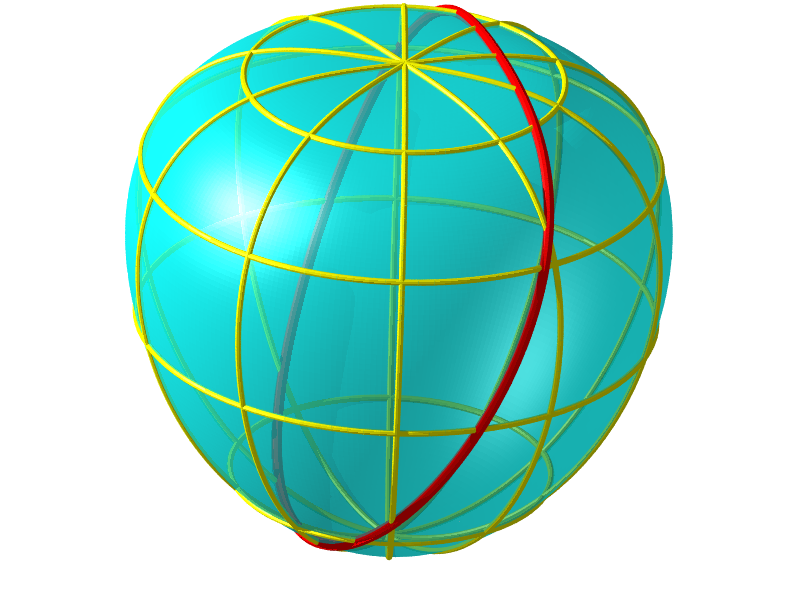
A Zoll surface discovered by Zoll in 1903. A closed geodesic is pictured in red.

In mathematics, particularly in differential geometry, a Zoll surface, named after Otto Zoll, is a surface homeomorphic to the 2-sphere, equipped with a Riemannian metric all of whose geodesics are closed and of equal length. While the usual unit-sphere metric on S^{2} obviously has this property, it also has an infinite-dimensional family of geometrically distinct deformations that are still Zoll surfaces. In particular, most Zoll surfaces do not have constant curvature.

Zoll, a student of David Hilbert, discovered the first non-trivial examples.

== See also ==
- Funk transform: The original motivation for studying the Funk transform was to describe Zoll metrics on the sphere.
