= Lazar Lyusternik =

Soviet mathematician (1899–1981)

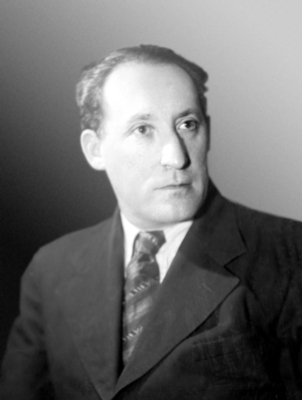
- Born: Lazar Aronovich Lyusternik; 31 December 1899; Zduńska Wola, Kalisz Governorate, Congress Poland, Russian Empire
- Died: 22 July 1981 (aged 81); Moscow, Soviet Union
- Education: Moscow State University
- Scientific career
- Fields: Mathematics
- Workplaces: Moscow State University
- Doctoral advisor: Nikolai Luzin
- Doctoral students: Abram Ilyich Fet; Mark Vishik
- Lazar Lyusternik's voice Recorded 26 November 1970

Lazar Aronovich Lyusternik (also Lusternik, Lusternick, Ljusternik; Russian: Лазарь Аронович Люстерник; 31 December 1899 – 22 July 1981) was a Soviet mathematician. He is famous for his work in topology and differential geometry, to which he applied the variational principle. Using the theory he introduced, together with Lev Schnirelmann, he proved the theorem of the three geodesics, a conjecture by Henri Poincaré that every convex body in 3-dimensions has at least three simple closed geodesics. The ellipsoid with distinct but nearly equal axis is the critical case with exactly three closed geodesics.

The Lusternik–Schnirelmann theory, as it is called now, is based on the previous work by Poincaré, David Birkhoff, and Marston Morse. It has led to numerous advances in differential geometry and topology. For this work Lyusternik received the Stalin Prize in 1946. In addition to serving as a professor of mathematics at Moscow State University, Lyusternik also worked at the Steklov Mathematical Institute (RAS) from 1934 to 1948 and the Lebedev Institute of Precise Mechanics and Computer Engineering (IPMCE) from 1948 to 1955.

He was a student of Nikolai Luzin. In 1930 he became one of the initiators of the Egorov affair and then one of the participants in the notorious political persecution of his teacher Nikolai Luzin known as the Luzin affair.

== See also ==
- Lusternik–Schnirelmann category
- Lyusternik's generalization of the Brunn–Minkowski theorem
