= Resurgent function =

The term resurgent function (from Latin: resurgere, to get up again) comes from French mathematician Jean Écalle's theory of resurgent functions and alien calculus. The theory evolved from the summability of divergent series (see Borel summation) and treats analytic functions with isolated singularities. He introduced the term in the late 1970s.

Resurgent functions have applications in asymptotic analysis, in the theory of differential equations, in perturbation theory and in quantum field theory.

For analytic functions with isolated singularities, the Alien calculus can be derived, a special algebra for their derivatives.

== Definition ==
A $\Omega$-resurgent function is an element of $\mathbb{C}\delta\oplus \hat{\mathcal{R}}_{\Omega}$, i.e. an element of the form $c\delta + \hat{\phi}$ from $\mathbb{C}\delta \oplus \mathbb{C}\{\zeta\}$, where $c\in \mathbb{C}$ and $\hat{\phi}$ is a $\Omega$-continuable germ.

A power series $\widetilde{\phi}\in \mathbb{C}[[z^{-1}]]$ whose formal Borel transformation is a $\Omega$-resurgent function is called $\Omega$-resurgent series.

== Basic concepts and notation ==
Convergence at $\infty$:

The formal power series $\phi(z) \in \mathbb{C}[[z^{-1}]]$ is convergent at $\infty$ if the associated formal power series $\psi(t) = \phi(1/t) \in \mathbb{C}[[t]]$ has a positive radius of convergence. $\mathbb{C}\{z^{-1}\}$ denotes the space of formal power series convergent at $\infty$.

Formal Borel transform:

The formal Borel transform (named after Émile Borel) is the operator $\mathcal{B}:z^{-1}\mathbb{C}[[z^{-1} ]]\to \mathbb{C}[[\zeta]]$ defined by

$\mathcal{B}:\phi=\sum\limits_{n=0}^\infty a_n z^{-n-1}\mapsto \hat{\phi }=\sum\limits_{n= 0}^\infty a_n \frac{\zeta^n}{n!}$.

Convolution in $\mathbb{C}\{\zeta\}$:

Let $\hat{\phi},\hat{\psi}\in \mathbb{C}[[\zeta]]$, then the convolution is given by

$$\hat{\phi}*\hat{\psi}:=\mathcal{B}[\phi\psi]$$.

By adjunction we can add a unit to the convolution in $\mathbb{C}[[\zeta]]$ and introduce the vector space $\mathbb{C}\times \mathbb{C}[[z]]$, where we denote the $(1,0)$ element with $\delta$. Using the convention $\{0\}\times \mathbb{C}[[\zeta]]:=\mathbb{C}[[\zeta]]$ we can write the space as $\mathbb{C}\delta\oplus \mathbb{C}[[z]]$ and define

$$(a\delta + \hat{\phi })*(b\delta + \hat{\psi }) := ab\delta + a\hat{\psi } + b \hat{\phi } +\hat{\phi}*\hat{\psi}$$

and set $\mathcal{B}1 := \delta$.

$\Omega$-resummable seed:

Let $\Omega$ be a non-empty discrete subset of $\mathbb{C}$ and define $\mathbb{D}_R=\{\zeta\in \mathbb{C}\mid |\zeta-0| < R\}\setminus\{0\}$.

Let $r$ be the radius of convergence of $\hat{\phi}$. $\hat{\phi}$ is a $\Omega$-continuable seed if an $R$ exists such that $r \geq R>0$ and $\mathbb{D}_R\cap \Omega=\emptyset$, and $\hat{\phi}$ analytic continuation along some path in $\mathbb{C}\setminus \Omega$ starting at a point in $\mathbb{D}_R$.

$\hat{\mathcal{R}}_{\Omega}$ denotes the space of $\Omega$-continuable germs in $\mathbb{C}\{\zeta \}$.

== Bibliography ==
- Les Fonctions Résurgentes, Jean Écalle, vols. 1–3, pub. Math. Orsay, 1981-1985
- Divergent Series, Summability and Resurgence I, Claude Mitschi and David Sauzin, Springer Verlag
- "Guided tour through resurgence theory", Jean Écalle
