= Selberg zeta function =

The Selberg zeta-function was introduced by Atle Selberg (1956). It is analogous to the famous Riemann zeta function

$$\zeta(s) = \prod_{p\in\mathbb{P}} \frac{1}{1-p^{-s}}$$

where $\mathbb{P}$ is the set of prime numbers. The Selberg zeta-function uses the lengths of simple closed geodesics instead of the prime numbers. If $\Gamma$ is a subgroup of SL(2, R), the associated Selberg zeta function is defined as follows,

$$\zeta_\Gamma(s)=\prod_p(1-N(p)^{-s})^{-1},$$

or

$$Z_\Gamma(s)=\prod_p\prod^\infty_{n=0}(1-N(p)^{-s-n}),$$

where p runs over conjugacy classes of prime geodesics (equivalently, conjugacy classes of primitive hyperbolic elements of $\Gamma$), and N(p) denotes $\exp(\text{length of }p)$ (equivalently, the square of the bigger eigenvalue of p).

For any hyperbolic surface of finite area there is an associated Selberg zeta-function; this function is a meromorphic function defined in the complex plane. The zeta function is defined in terms of the closed geodesics of the surface.

The zeros and poles of the Selberg zeta-function, Z(s), can be described in terms of spectral data of the surface.

The zeros are at the following points:

1. For every cusp form with eigenvalue $s_0(1-s_0)$ there exists a zero at the point $s_0$. The order of the zero equals the dimension of the corresponding eigenspace. (A cusp form is an eigenfunction to the Laplace–Beltrami operator which has Fourier expansion with zero constant term.)
2. The zeta-function also has a zero at every pole of the determinant of the scattering matrix, $\phi(s)$. The order of the zero equals the order of the corresponding pole of the scattering matrix.

The zeta-function also has poles at $1/2 - \mathbb{N}$, and can have zeros or poles at the points $- \mathbb{N}$.

The Ihara zeta function is considered a p-adic (and a graph-theoretic) analogue of the Selberg zeta function.

== Selberg zeta-function for the modular group ==
For the case where the surface is $\Gamma \backslash \mathbb{H}^2$, where $\Gamma$ is the modular group, the Selberg zeta-function is of special interest. For this special case the Selberg zeta-function is intimately connected to the Riemann zeta-function.

In this case the determinant of the scattering matrix is given by:

$\varphi(s) = \pi^{1/2} \frac{ \Gamma(s-1/2) \zeta(2s-1) }{ \Gamma(s) \zeta(2s) }.$

In particular, we see that if the Riemann zeta-function has a zero at $s_0$, then the determinant of the scattering matrix has a pole at $s_0/2$, and hence the Selberg zeta-function has a zero at $s_0/2$.

== See also ==
- Selberg trace formula
