= Lev Schnirelmann =

Soviet mathematician (1905–1938)

Lev G. Schnirelmann
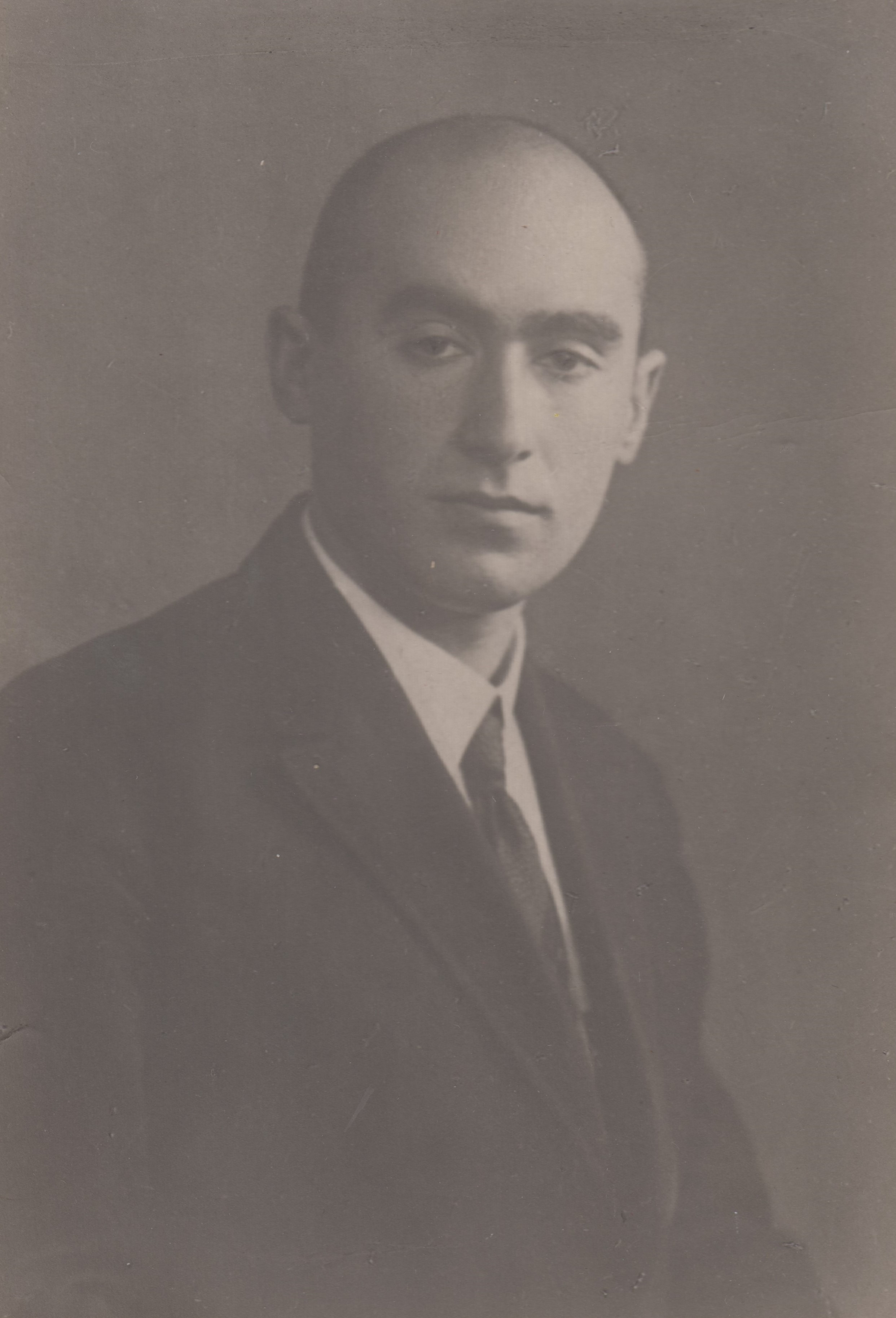
- L.G. Schnirelmann in 1925 (from A. O. Gelfond archives)
- Born: 2 January 1905; Gomel, Russian Empire
- Died: 24 September 1938 (aged 33); Moscow, RSFSR, Soviet Union
- Education: Moscow State University
- Known for: Lusternik–Schnirelmann category Schnirelmann density Schnirelmann's constant Schnirelmann's theorem
- Scientific career
- Fields: Mathematics
- Workplaces: Steklov Mathematical Institute
- Doctoral advisor: Nikolai Luzin

Lev Genrikhovich Schnirelmann (also Shnirelman, Shnirel'man; Лев Ге́нрихович Шнирельма́н; 2 January 1905 – 24 September 1938) was a Soviet mathematician who worked on number theory, topology and differential geometry.

== Work ==
Schnirelmann sought to prove Goldbach's conjecture. In 1930, using the Brun sieve, he proved that any natural number greater than 1 can be written as the sum of not more than C prime numbers, where C is an effectively computable constant.

His other fundamental work is joint with Lazar Lyusternik. Together, they developed the Lusternik–Schnirelmann category, as it is called now, based on the previous work by Henri Poincaré, George David Birkhoff, and Marston Morse. The theory gives a global invariant of spaces, and has led to advances in differential geometry and topology. They also proved the theorem of the three geodesics, that a Riemannian manifold topologically equivalent to a sphere has at least three simple closed geodesics.

== Biography ==
Schnirelmann graduated from Moscow State University in 1925 and then worked at the Steklov Mathematical Institute from 1934 to 1938. His advisor was Nikolai Luzin.

Schnirelmann committed suicide in Moscow on 24 September 1938, for reasons that are not clear. According to Lev Pontryagin's memoir from 1998, Schnirelmann gassed himself, due to depression brought on by feelings of inability to work at the same high level as earlier in his career. On the other hand, according to an interview Eugene Dynkin gave in 1988, Schnirelman took his own life after the NKVD tried to recruit him as an informer.

He was an extremely talented mathematician whose premature death in 1938 prevented him from fulfilling his potential... He was a charming young man. The great misfortune of his life was that his lodgings consisted of no more than a wretched furnished room, to which he was ashamed to bring his friends. It was with great embarrassment that he let me see it once. People told me that this alone was what had kept him from marrying.

— André Weil, The Apprenticeship of a Mathematician, p. 107-108

== See also ==
- Inscribed square problem
- Schnirelmann density
- Schnirelmann's constant
- Schnirelmann's theorem
