= Henri Dulac =

French mathematician

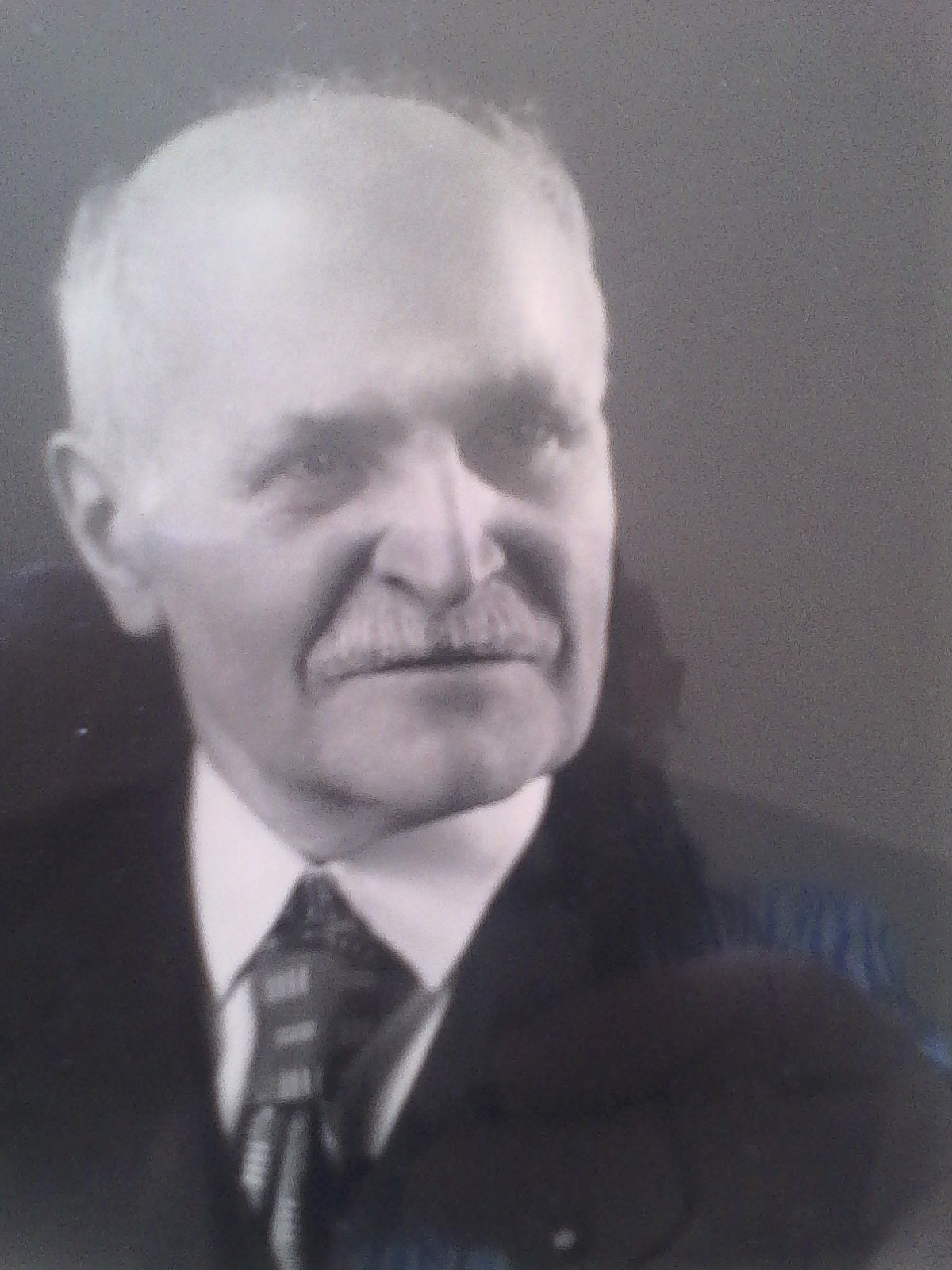
- Born: Henri Claudius Rosarius Dulac; October 3, 1870; Fayence, France
- Died: September 2, 1955 (aged 84); Fayence, France
- Education: École polytechnique École centrale de Lyon
- Occupation: Mathematician
- Children: 3

Henri Claudius Marie Rosario Dulac (3 October 1870 – 2 September 1955) was a French mathematician.

== Life ==
Born in Fayence, France, Dulac graduated from École Polytechnique (Paris, class of 1892) and obtained a Doctorate in Mathematics. He started to teach a class of mathematic analysis at University, in Grenoble (France), Algiers (today Algeria) and Poitiers (France). Holder of a pulpit in pure mathematics in the Sciences University of Lyon (France) in 1911, his teaching was suspended during the First World War (1914 – 1918) and he had to serve as officer in the French army. After the war, he became holder of a pulpit of differential and integral calculus and also taught in École Centrale Lyon. He became examiner at École Polytechnique (Paris) and President of the admission jury. Awarded Officer of Legion d'honneur, the French order established by Napoleon and associate member of the French Academy of Sciences, he published part of Euler's works and contributed to the research through many publications in France and abroad.

Father of 3 children, Anie (1901–1935), bachelor in mathematics, Jean (1903–2005), graduate of École Polytechnique, 1921 and Robert (1904–1996), graduate of polytechnique, 1922; he died in Fayence, France, in 1955.

== Work ==
Among his publications:

- Recherches sur les points singuliers des équations différentielles (Journal of École Polytechnique, 1904).
- Intégrales d'une équation différentielle (Annales University of Grenoble, 1905).
- Sur les Points dicritiques (Journal of mathématics, 1906).
- Sur les séries de Mac-Laurin à plusieurs variables (Acta Mathematica, 1906).
- Détermination et intégration d'une classe d'équations différentielles (Bulletin of mathematical sciences).
- Intégrales passant par un point singulier (Rendeconti del Circolo, 1911).
- Sur les points singuliers (Annales, Toulouse, 1912).
- Solutions d'un système d'équations différentielles (Bulletin of the mathematical society, 1913).
- Sur les cycles limites (Bulletin of the mathematical society, 1923).
- Points singuliers des équations différentielles (Mémorial des sciences mathématiques, 1932).
- Courbes définies par une équation différentielle du premier ordre (Mémorial des sciences mathématiques, 1934).

His researches are still mentioned or challenged by international university PHD students and professors, even a hundred years after being published. As an example:

- The Center Variety of Polynomial Differential Systems – Abdu Salam Jarrah, Faculté des sciences mathématiques, Université du Nouveau Mexique, USA (2001).
- Complete Polynomial Vector Fields on C2 – Julio Rebelo, Institute for Mathematical Sciences, SUNY, New York, USA (Oct. 2002).
- Dimension Increase and Splitting for Poincaré-Dulac Normal forms – Giuseppe Gaeta, Faculté de Mathématique de l'Université de Milan and Sebastian Walcher, chaire de Mathématique, Aix La Chapelle, Journal of Non linear Mathematical Physices (2005).

Sources: Technica, n° 190, Nov. 1955, École Centrale Lyon, French Academy of Sciences, updated by Louis Boisgibault, his great grandson.

== See also ==
- Bendixson–Dulac theorem
- Hilbert's sixteenth problem
- Transseries
