= Closed geodesic =

In differential geometry and dynamical systems, a closed geodesic on a Riemannian manifold is a geodesic that returns to its starting point with the same tangent direction. It may be formalized as the projection of a closed orbit of the geodesic flow on the tangent space of the manifold.

== Definition ==
In a Riemannian manifold (M,g), a closed geodesic is a curve $\gamma:\mathbb R\rightarrow M$ that is a geodesic for the metric g and is periodic.

Closed geodesics can be characterized by means of a variational principle. Denoting by $\Lambda M$ the space of smooth 1-periodic curves on M, closed geodesics of period 1 are precisely the critical points of the energy function $E:\Lambda M\rightarrow\mathbb R$, defined by

$$E(\gamma)=\int_0^1 g_{\gamma(t)}(\dot\gamma(t),\dot\gamma(t))\,\mathrm{d}t.$$

If $\gamma$ is a closed geodesic of period p, the reparametrized curve $t\mapsto\gamma(pt)$ is a closed geodesic of period 1, and therefore it is a critical point of E. If $\gamma$ is a critical point of E, so are the reparametrized curves $\gamma^m$, for each $m\in\mathbb N$, defined by $\gamma^m(t):=\gamma(mt)$. Thus every closed geodesic on M gives rise to an infinite sequence of critical points of the energy E.

== Examples ==
On the $n$-dimensional unit sphere with the standard metric, every geodesic – a great circle – is closed. On a smooth surface topologically equivalent to the sphere, this may not be true, but there are always at least three simple closed geodesics; this is the theorem of the three geodesics. Manifolds all of whose geodesics are closed have been thoroughly investigated in the mathematical literature. On a compact hyperbolic surface, whose fundamental group has no torsion, closed geodesics are in one-to-one correspondence with non-trivial conjugacy classes of elements in the Fuchsian group of the surface.

== See also ==
- Lyusternik–Fet theorem
- Theorem of the three geodesics
- Curve-shortening flow
- Selberg trace formula
- Selberg zeta function
- Zoll surface
