= Free factor complex =

Concept in mathematics

In mathematics, the free factor complex (sometimes also called the complex of free factors) is a free group counterpart of the notion of the curve complex of a finite type surface. The free factor complex was originally introduced in a 1998 paper of Allen Hatcher and Karen Vogtmann. Like the curve complex, the free factor complex is known to be Gromov-hyperbolic. The free factor complex plays a significant role in the study of large-scale geometry of $\operatorname{Out}(F_n)$.

== Formal definition ==
For a free group $G$ a proper free factor of $G$ is a subgroup $A\le G$ such that $A\ne \{1\}, A\ne G$ and that there exists a subgroup $B\le G$ such that $G=A\ast B$.

Let $n\ge 3$ be an integer and let $F_n$ be the free group of rank $n$. The free factor complex $\mathcal F_n$ for $F_n$ is a simplicial complex where:

(1) The 0-cells are the conjugacy classes in $F_n$ of proper free factors of $F_n$, that is

$$\mathcal F_n^{(0)}=\{[A] | A\le F_n \text{ is a proper free factor of } F_n \}.$$

(2) For $k\ge 1$, a $k$-simplex in $\mathcal F_n$ is a collection of $k+1$ distinct 0-cells $\{v_0, v_1, \dots, v_k\}\subset \mathcal F_n^{(0)}$ such that there exist free factors $A_0,A_1,\dots, A_k$ of $F_n$ such that $v_i=A_i$ for $i=0,1,\dots, k$, and that $A_0\le A_1\le \dots \le A_k$. [The assumption that these 0-cells are distinct implies that $A_i\ne A_{i+1}$ for $i=0,1,\dots, k-1$]. In particular, a 1-cell is a collection $\{[A], [B]\}$ of two distinct 0-cells where $A,B\le F_n$ are proper free factors of $F_n$ such that $A\lneq B$.

For $n=2$ the above definition produces a complex with no $k$-cells of dimension $k\ge 1$. Therefore, $\mathcal F_2$ is defined slightly differently. One still defines $\mathcal F_2^{(0)}$ to be the set of conjugacy classes of proper free factors of $F_2$; (such free factors are necessarily infinite cyclic). Two distinct 0-simplices $\{v_0,v_1\}\subset \mathcal F_2^{(0)}$ determine a 1-simplex in $\mathcal F_2$ if and only if there exists a free basis $a,b$ of $F_2$ such that $v_0=[\langle a\rangle], v_1=[\langle b\rangle]$. The complex $\mathcal F_2$ has no $k$-cells of dimension $k\ge 2$.

For $n\ge 2$ the 1-skeleton $\mathcal F_n^{(1)}$ is called the free factor graph for $F_n$.

== Main properties ==
- For every integer $n\ge 3$ the complex $\mathcal F_n$ is connected, locally infinite, and has dimension $n-2$. The complex $\mathcal F_2$ is connected, locally infinite, and has dimension 1.
- For $n=2$, the graph $\mathcal F_2$ is isomorphic to the Farey graph.
- There is a natural action of $\operatorname{Out}(F_n)$ on $\mathcal F_n$ by simplicial automorphisms. For a k-simplex $\Delta=\{[A_0],\dots, [A_k]\}$ and $\varphi\in \operatorname{Out}(F_n)$ one has $\varphi \Delta:=\{[\varphi(A_0)],\dots, [\varphi(A_k)]\}$.
- For $n\ge 3$ the complex $\mathcal F_n$ has the homotopy type of a wedge of spheres of dimension $n-2$.
- For every integer $n\ge 2$, the free factor graph $\mathcal F_n^{(1)}$, equipped with the simplicial metric (where every edge has length 1), is a connected graph of infinite diameter.
- For every integer $n\ge 2$, the free factor graph $\mathcal F_n^{(1)}$, equipped with the simplicial metric, is Gromov-hyperbolic. This result was originally established by Mladen Bestvina and Mark Feighn; see also for subsequent alternative proofs.
- An element $\varphi\in \operatorname{Out}(F_n)$ acts as a loxodromic isometry of $\mathcal F_n^{(1)}$ if and only if $\varphi$ is fully irreducible.
- There exists a coarsely Lipschitz coarsely $\operatorname{Out}(F_n)$-equivariant coarsely surjective map $\mathcal{FS}_n\to \mathcal F_n^{(1)}$, where $\mathcal{FS}_n$ is the free splittings complex. However, this map is not a quasi-isometry. The free splitting complex is also known to be Gromov-hyperbolic, as was proved by Handel and Mosher.
- Similarly, there exists a natural coarsely Lipschitz coarsely $\operatorname{Out}(F_n)$-equivariant coarsely surjective map $CV_n\to \mathcal F_n^{(1)}$, where $CV_n$ is the (volume-ones normalized) Culler–Vogtmann Outer space, equipped with the symmetric Lipschitz metric. The map $\pi$ takes a geodesic path in $CV_n$ to a path in $\mathcal FF_n$ contained in a uniform Hausdorff neighborhood of the geodesic with the same endpoints.
- The hyperbolic boundary $\partial \mathcal F_n^{(1)}$ of the free factor graph can be identified with the set of equivalence classes of "arational" $F_n$-trees in the boundary $\partial CV_n$ of the Outer space $CV_n$.
- The free factor complex is a key tool in studying the behavior of random walks on $\operatorname{Out}(F_n)$ and in identifying the Poisson boundary of $\operatorname{Out}(F_n)$.

== Other models ==
There are several other models which produce graphs coarsely $\operatorname{Out}(F_n)$-equivariantly quasi-isometric to $\mathcal F_n^{(1)}$. These models include:

- The graph whose vertex set is $\mathcal F_n^{0}$ and where two distinct vertices $v_0,v_1$ are adjacent if and only if there exists a free product decomposition $F_n=A\ast B\ast C$ such that $v_0=[A]$ and $v_1=[B]$.
- The free bases graph whose vertex set is the set of $F_n$-conjugacy classes of free bases of $F_n$, and where two vertices $v_0,v_1$ are adjacent if and only if there exist free bases $\mathcal A, \mathcal B$ of $F_n$ such that $v_0=[\mathcal A], v_1=[\mathcal B]$ and $\mathcal A\cap \mathcal B\ne \varnothing$.

== See also ==
- Mapping class group
