= Michael Handel =

American mathematician

- Born: Brooklyn
- Education: Brandeis University (BA); University of California, Berkeley (PhD)
- Known for: Dynamical Systems
- Awards: Alfred P. Sloan Fellow; Fellow of the American Mathematical Society
- Scientific career
- Fields: Mathematics
- Workplaces: Lehman College; CUNY Graduate Center
- Thesis: A Resolution of Two Stratification Conjectures Concerning CS Sets (1975)
- Doctoral advisor: Robion Kirby

Michael Handel is an American mathematician known for his work in Geometric group theory. He is a professor in the Department of Mathematics at Lehman College of the City University of New York and a professor of mathematics at the CUNY Graduate Center.

== Career ==
Michael Handel graduated with a B.A. in mathematics from Brandeis University in 1971. He received his Ph.D. from University of California, Berkeley, in 1975 under the supervision of Robion Kirby. From 1975 to 1978, he was an instructor at Princeton University. He joined the faculty of Michigan State University as an assistant professor in 1978, and was promoted to associate professor in 1983. Handel was a visiting scholar at the Institute for Advanced Study from 1978 to 1979, and again from 1987 to 1988. In 1990, he joined the Mathematics Department at Lehman College.

Handel is best known for developing the Train track map method in Geometric group theory in collaboration with Mladen Bestvina in 1992. Bestvina, Feighn and Handel later proved that the group Out(F_{n}) satisfies the Tits alternative, settling a long-standing open problem.

== Awards and honors ==
- In 1984, Handel won a Sloan Research Fellowship.
- In 2014, he became a fellow of the American Mathematical Society.

== Selected publications ==
- Handel, Michael. "One Dimensional Minimal Sets and the Seifert Conjecture ". Annals of Mathematics (2) 111 (1980), number 1, pages 35–66. DOI:10.2307/1971216
- Feighn, Mark; Handel, Michael. "Mapping tori of free group automorphisms are coherent". Annals of Mathematics (2) 149 (1999), number 3, pages 1061–1077. MR 1709311
- Bestvina, Mladen; Feighn, Mark; Handel, Michael. The Tits alternative for Out(F_{n}). I. Dynamics of exponentially-growing automorphisms. Annals of Mathematics (2), volume 151 (2000), number 2, pages 517–623
- Bestvina, Mladen; Feighn, Mark; Handel, Michael. The Tits alternative for Out(F_{n}). II. A Kolchin type theorem. Annals of Mathematics (2), volume 161 (2005), number 1, pages 1–59 MR 2150382
- Handel, Michael; Mosher, Lee. "The free splitting complex of a free group, I: hyperbolicity". Geometry & Topology 17 (2013), number 3, pages 1581–1672. MR 3073931

== See also ==
- Out(F_{n})
- Train track map
- Pseudo-Anosov map
