= Fully irreducible automorphism =

Concept in mathematics

In the mathematical subject geometric group theory, a fully irreducible automorphism of the free group F_{n} is an element of Out(F_{n}) which has no periodic conjugacy classes of proper free factors in F_{n} (where n > 1). Fully irreducible automorphisms are also referred to as "irreducible with irreducible powers" or "iwip" automorphisms. The notion of being fully irreducible provides a key Out(F_{n}) counterpart of the notion of a pseudo-Anosov element of the mapping class group of a finite type surface. Fully irreducibles play an important role in the study of structural properties of individual elements and of subgroups of Out(F_{n}).

== Formal definition ==
Let $\varphi\in \operatorname{Out}(F_n)$ where $n\ge 2$. Then $\varphi$ is called fully irreducible if there does not exist an integer $p\ne 0$ and a proper free factor $A$ of $F_n$ such that $\varphi^p([A])=[A]$, where $[A]$ is the conjugacy class of $A$ in $F_n$. Equivalently, for all $p > 0$ and any proper free factor $A$ of $F_n$, $\varphi^{p}([A]) \neq [A]$. Here saying that $A$ is a proper free factor of $F_n$ means that $A\ne 1$ and there exists a subgroup $B\le F_n, B\ne 1$ such that $F_n=A\ast B$.

Also, $\Phi\in \operatorname{Aut}(F_n)$ is called fully irreducible if the outer automorphism class $\varphi\in \operatorname{Out}(F_n)$ of $\Phi$ is fully irreducible.

Two fully irreducibles $\varphi,\psi\in \operatorname{Out}(F_n)$ are called independent if $\langle \varphi\rangle \cap \langle \psi \rangle = \{1\}$.

=== Relationship to irreducible automorphisms ===
The notion of being fully irreducible grew out of an older notion of an "irreducible" outer automorphism of $F_n$ originally introduced in. An element $\varphi\in \operatorname{Out}(F_n)$, where $n\ge 2$, is called irreducible if there does not exist a free product decomposition

$$F_n=A_1\ast\dots \ast A_k \ast C$$

with $k\ge 1$, and with $A_i\ne 1, i=1,\dots k$ being proper free factors of $F_n$, such that $\varphi$ permutes the conjugacy classes $[A_1], \dots, [A_k]$.

Then $\varphi\in \operatorname{Out}(F_n)$ is fully irreducible in the sense of the definition above if and only if for every $p\ne 0$ $\varphi^p$ is irreducible.

It is known that for any atoroidal $\varphi\in \operatorname{Out}(F_n)$ (that is, without periodic conjugacy classes of nontrivial elements of $F_n$), being irreducible is equivalent to being fully irreducible. For non-atoroidal automorphisms, Bestvina and Handel produce an example of an irreducible but not fully irreducible element of $\operatorname{Out}(F_n)$, induced by a suitably chosen pseudo-Anosov homeomorphism of a surface with more than one boundary component.

== Properties ==
- If $\varphi\in \operatorname{Out}(F_n)$ and $p\ne 0$ then $\varphi$ is fully irreducible if and only if $\varphi^p$ is fully irreducible.
- Every fully irreducible $\varphi\in \operatorname{Out}(F_n)$ can be represented by an expanding irreducible train track map.
- Every fully irreducible $\varphi\in \operatorname{Out}(F_n)$ has exponential growth in $F_n$ given by a stretch factor $\lambda=\lambda(\varphi)>1$. This stretch factor has the property that for every free basis $X$ of $F_n$ (and, more generally, for every point of the Culler–Vogtmann Outer space $X\in cv_n$) and for every $1\ne g\in F_n$ one has:

$$\lim_{k\to\infty}\sqrt[k]{\|\varphi^k(g)\|_X}=\lambda.$$

Moreover, $\lambda=\lambda(\varphi)$ is equal to the Perron–Frobenius eigenvalue of the transition matrix of any train track representative of $\varphi$.

- Unlike for stretch factors of pseudo-Anosov surface homeomorphisms, it can happen that for a fully irreducible $\varphi\in \operatorname{Out}(F_n)$ one has $\lambda(\varphi)\ne \lambda(\varphi^{-1})$ and this behavior is believed to be generic. However, Handel and Mosher proved that for every $n\ge 2$ there exists a finite constant $0< C_n <\infty$ such that for every fully irreducible $\varphi\in \operatorname{Out}(F_n)$

$$\frac{\log\lambda(\varphi) }{\log \lambda(\varphi^{-1})} \le C_n.$$

- A fully irreducible $\varphi\in \operatorname{Out}(F_n)$ is non-atoroidal, that is, has a periodic conjugacy class of a nontrivial element of $F_n$, if and only if $\varphi$ is induced by a pseudo-Anosov homeomorphism of a compact connected surface with one boundary component and with the fundamental group isomorphic to $F_n$.
- A fully irreducible element $\varphi\in \operatorname{Out}(F_n)$ has exactly two fixed points in the Thurston compactification $\overline{CV}_n$ of the projectivized Outer space $CV_n$, and $\varphi\in \operatorname{Out}(F_n)$ acts on $\overline{CV}_n$ with "North-South" dynamics.
- For a fully irreducible element $\varphi\in \operatorname{Out}(F_n)$, its fixed points in $\overline{CV}_n$ are projectivized $\mathbb R$-trees $[T_+(\varphi)], [T_-(\varphi)]$, where $T_+(\varphi),T_-(\varphi)\in \overline{cv}_n$, satisfying the property that $T_+(\varphi)\varphi=\lambda(\varphi) T_+(\varphi)$ and $T_-(\varphi)\varphi^{-1}=\lambda(\varphi^{-1}) T_-(\varphi)$.
- A fully irreducible element $\varphi\in \operatorname{Out}(F_n)$ acts on the space of projectivized geodesic currents $\mathbb PCurr(F_n)$ with either "North-South" or "generalized North-South" dynamics, depending on whether $\varphi$ is atoroidal or non-atoroidal.
- If $\varphi\in \operatorname{Out}(F_n)$ is fully irreducible, then the commensurator $Comm(\langle \varphi\rangle)\le \operatorname{Out}(F_n)$ is virtually cyclic. In particular, the centralizer and the normalizer of $\langle \varphi\rangle$ in $\operatorname{Out}(F_n)$ are virtually cyclic.
- If $\varphi,\psi\in \operatorname{Out}(F_n)$ are independent fully irreducibles, then $[T_\pm(\varphi)], [T_\pm(\psi)]\in \overline{CV}_n$ are four distinct points, and there exists $M\ge 1$ such that for every $p,q\ge M$ the subgroup $\langle \varphi^p, \psi^q\rangle \le \operatorname{Out}(F_n)$ is isomorphic to $F_2$.
- If $\varphi\in \operatorname{Out}(F_n)$ is fully irreducible and $\varphi\in H\le \operatorname{Out}(F_n)$, then either $H$ is virtually cyclic or $H$ contains a subgroup isomorphic to $F_2$. [This statement provides a strong form of the Tits alternative for subgroups of $\operatorname{Out}(F_n)$ containing fully irreducibles.]
- If $H\le \operatorname{Out}(F_n)$ is an arbitrary subgroup, then either $H$ contains a fully irreducible element, or there exist a finite index subgroup $H_0\le H$ and a proper free factor $A$ of $F_n$ such that $H_0[A]=[A]$.
- An element $\varphi\in \operatorname{Out}(F_n)$ acts as a loxodromic isometry on the free factor complex $\mathcal{FF}_n$ if and only if $\varphi$ is fully irreducible.
- It is known that "random" (in the sense of random walks) elements of $\operatorname{Out}(F_n)$ are fully irreducible. More precisely, if $\mu$ is a measure on $\operatorname{Out}(F_n)$ whose support generates a semigroup in $\operatorname{Out}(F_n)$ containing some two independent fully irreducibles. Then for the random walk of length $k$ on $\operatorname{Out}(F_n)$ determined by $\mu$, the probability that we obtain a fully irreducible element converges to 1 as $k\to \infty$.
- A fully irreducible element $\varphi\in \operatorname{Out}(F_n)$ admits a (generally non-unique) periodic axis in the volume-one normalized Outer space $X_n$, which is geodesic with respect to the asymmetric Lipschitz metric on $X_n$ and possesses strong "contraction"-type properties. A related object, defined for an atoroidal fully irreducible $\varphi\in \operatorname{Out}(F_n)$, is the axis bundle $A_\varphi\subseteq X_n$, which is a certain $\varphi$-invariant closed subset proper homotopy equivalent to a line.
