= John Smillie (mathematician) =

American mathematician (born 1953)

- Born: John David Smillie; February 18, 1953 (age 73); Ithaca, New York, U.S.
- Education: New College of Florida (BA); University of Chicago (MS, PhD)
- Occupation: Mathematician
- Spouse: Karen Vogtmann
- Father: David Smillie

John David Smillie (born February 18, 1953, in Ithaca, New York) is an American mathematician, specializing in dynamical systems.

== Biography ==
His father, David Smillie, was a professor of psychology. John Smillie graduated in 1974 with a B.A. in mathematics from New College of Florida. At the University of Chicago he graduated with an M.S. in 1975 and a Ph.D. in 1977. His Ph.D. thesis Affinely flat manifolds was supervised by Richard Lashof. From 1977 to 1980 Smillie was an instructor at Princeton University. For the academic year 1980–1981 he was at the Institute for Advanced Study. He was a postdoc for the academic year 1981–1982 at the University of California, Berkeley, and for the academic year 1982–1983 at Graduate Center of the City University of New York (CUNY). At CUNY Smillie was an assistant professor from 1983 to 1986 and an associate professor from 1986 to 1989 at Lehman College and CUNY Graduate Center. At Cornell University has he was a visiting associate professor from 1986 to 1987, an associate professor from 1987 to December 1990, and a full professor from January 1991 to July 2015, when he became an emeritus professor. At Cornell University he was the chair of the mathematics department from 1999 to 2002. In 2013 he became a professor at the University of Warwick. He is married to the mathematician Karen Vogtmann. The couple moved in 2013 to England and settled in Kenilworth.

His research deals with "polygonal billiards and dynamics of flows on Teichmüller space; analysis of algorithms; and diffeomorphisms of surfaces", as well as "translation surfaces and complex dynamics in higher dimensions".

Smillie has held visiting positions at several institutions, including the University of Illinois Chicago, the École normale supérieure de Lyon, the Institut des Hautes Études Scientifiques, the Mathematical Sciences Research Institute in Berkeley, the Research Institute for Mathematical Sciences of Kyoto University, and the Mathematical Institute of the Hausdorff Center for Mathematics in Bonn. He has given talks in the USA, Canada, France, Italy, Israel, Brazil, and China. In 2002 he was an invited speaker at the International Congress of Mathematicians in Beijing.

== Selected publications ==
- Kerckhoff, Steven; Masur, Howard; Smillie, John (1985). "A rational billiard flow is uniquely ergodic in almost every direction". Bulletin of the American Mathematical Society. 13 (2): 141–143. doi:10.1090/S0273-0979-1985-15398-4.
- Kerckhoff, Steven; Masur, Howard; Smillie, John (1986). "Ergodicity of Billiard Flows and Quadratic Differentials". Annals of Mathematics. 124 (2): 293–311. doi:10.2307/1971280. JSTOR 1971280.
- Batterson, Steve; Smillie, John (1990). "Rayleigh quotient iteration for nonsymmetric matrices". Mathematics of Computation. 55 (191): 169. Bibcode:1990MaCom..55..169B. doi:10.1090/S0025-5718-1990-1023041-4.
- Smillie, John; Vogtmann, Karen (1991). "Automorphisms of $SL_2$ of imaginary quadratic integers". Proceedings of the American Mathematical Society. 112 (3): 691. doi:10.1090/S0002-9939-1991-1065094-6.
- Bedford, Eric; Smillie, John (1991). "Polynomial Diffeomorphisms of C^{2}. II: Stable Manifolds and Recurrence". Journal of the American Mathematical Society. 4 (4): 657–679. JSTOR 2939284.
- Masur, Howard; Smillie, John (1991). "Hausdorff Dimension of Sets of Nonergodic Measured Foliations". Annals of Mathematics. 134 (3): 455–543. doi:10.2307/2944356. JSTOR 2944356.
- Bedford, Eric; Lyubich, Mikhail; Smillie, John (1993). "Polynomial diffeomorphisms of $C^2$. IV: The measure of maximal entropy and laminar currents". Inventiones Mathematicae. 112 (1): 77–125. arXiv:math/9205210. Bibcode:1993InMat.112...77B. doi:10.1007/BF01232426. S2CID 174190.
- Bedford, E.; Lyubich, M.; Smillie, J.; J (1993). "Distribution of periodic points of polynomial diffeomorphisms of $C^2$". Inventiones Mathematicae. 114: 277–288. arXiv:math/9301220. Bibcode:1993InMat.114..277B. doi:10.1007/BF01232671. S2CID 14653811.
- Smillie, John; Buzzard, Gregery T. (1996). "Complex dynamics in several variables". arXiv:math/9602211.
- Kenyon, Richard; Smillie, John (2000). "Billiards on rational-angled triangles". Commentarii Mathematici Helvetici. 75 (1): 65–108. doi:10.1007/s000140050113. S2CID 15709469.
- Calta, Kariane; Smillie, John (2007). "Algebraically periodic translation surfaces". arXiv:math/0703567.
- Smillie, John; Ulcigrai, Corinna (2009). "Symbolic coding for linear trajectories in the regular octagon". arXiv:0905.0871 [math.DS].
- Bedford, Eric; Smillie, John; Ueda, Tetsuo (2012). "Parabolic Bifurcations in Complex Dimension 2". arXiv:1208.2577 [math.DS].
- Bainbridge, Matt; Smillie, John; Weiss, Barak (2016). "Horocycle dynamics: New invariants and eigenform loci in the stratum H(1,1)". arXiv:1603.00808 [math.DS].
- Chaika, Jon; Smillie, John; Weiss, Barak (2020). "Tremors and horocycle dynamics on the moduli space of translation surfaces". arXiv:2004.04027 [math.DS].
