= Nielsen–Thurston classification =

Characterizes homeomorphisms of a compact orientable surface

In mathematics, Thurston's classification theorem characterizes homeomorphisms of a compact orientable surface. William Thurston's theorem completes the work initiated by Jakob Nielsen (1944).

Given a homeomorphism f : S → S, there is a map g isotopic to f such that at least one of the following holds:

- g is periodic, i.e. some power of g is the identity;
- g preserves some finite union of disjoint simple closed curves on S (in this case, g is called reducible); or
- g is pseudo-Anosov.

The case where S is a torus (i.e., a surface whose genus is one) is handled separately (see torus bundle) and was known before Thurston's work. If the genus of S is two or greater, then S is naturally hyperbolic, and the tools of Teichmüller theory become useful. In what follows, we assume S has genus at least two, as this is the case Thurston considered. (Note, however, that the cases where S has boundary or is not orientable are definitely still of interest.)

The three types in this classification are not mutually exclusive, though a pseudo-Anosov homeomorphism is never periodic or reducible. A reducible homeomorphism g can be further analyzed by cutting the surface along the preserved union of simple closed curves Γ. Each of the resulting compact surfaces with boundary is acted upon by some power (i.e. iterated composition) of g, and the classification can again be applied to this homeomorphism.

== The mapping class group for surfaces of higher genus ==
Thurston's classification applies to homeomorphisms of orientable surfaces of genus ≥ 2, but the type of a homeomorphism only depends on its associated element of the mapping class group Mod(S). In fact, the proof of the classification theorem leads to a canonical representative of each mapping class with good geometric properties. For example:

- When g is periodic, there is an element of its mapping class that is an isometry of a hyperbolic structure on S.
- When g is pseudo-Anosov, there is an element of its mapping class that preserves a pair of transverse singular foliations of S, stretching the leaves of one (the unstable foliation) while contracting the leaves of the other (the stable foliation).

== Mapping tori ==
Thurston's original motivation for developing this classification was to find geometric structures on mapping tori of the type predicted by the Geometrization conjecture. The mapping torus M_{g} of a homeomorphism g of a surface S is the 3-manifold obtained from S × [0,1] by gluing S × {0} to S × {1} using g. If S has genus at least two, the geometric structure of M_{g} is related to the type of g in the classification as follows:

- If g is periodic, then M_{g} has an H^{2} × R structure;
- If g is reducible, then M_{g} has incompressible tori, and should be cut along these tori to yield pieces that each have geometric structures (the JSJ decomposition);
- If g is pseudo-Anosov, then M_{g} has a hyperbolic (i.e. H^{3}) structure.

The first two cases are comparatively easy, while the existence of a hyperbolic structure on the mapping torus of a pseudo-Anosov homeomorphism is a deep and difficult theorem (also due to Thurston). The hyperbolic 3-manifolds that arise in this way are called fibered because they are surface bundles over the circle, and these manifolds are treated separately in the proof of Thurston's geometrization theorem for Haken manifolds. Fibered hyperbolic 3-manifolds have a number of interesting and pathological properties; for example, Cannon and Thurston showed that the surface subgroup of the arising Kleinian group has limit set which is a sphere-filling curve.

== Fixed point classification ==
The three types of surface homeomorphisms are also related to the dynamics of the mapping class group Mod(S) on the Teichmüller space T(S). Thurston introduced a compactification of T(S) that is homeomorphic to a closed ball, and to which the action of Mod(S) extends naturally. The type of an element g of the mapping class group in the Thurston classification is related to its fixed points when acting on the compactification of T(S):

- If g is periodic, then there is a fixed point within T(S); this point corresponds to a hyperbolic structure on S whose isometry group contains an element isotopic to g;
- If g is pseudo-Anosov, then g has no fixed points in T(S) but has a pair of fixed points on the Thurston boundary; these fixed points correspond to the stable and unstable foliations of S preserved by g.
- For some reducible mapping classes g, there is a single fixed point on the Thurston boundary; an example is a multi-twist along a pants decomposition Γ. In this case the fixed point of g on the Thurston boundary corresponds to Γ.

This is reminiscent of the classification of hyperbolic isometries into elliptic, parabolic, and hyperbolic types (which have fixed point structures similar to the periodic, reducible, and pseudo-Anosov types listed above).

== See also ==
- Train track map
