= Debra Boutin =

American mathematician

- Born: November 1, 1957; Holyoke, Massachusetts
- Died: August 20, 2025 (aged 67); Greenfield, Massachusetts
- Education: AB, Smith College, 1991; PhD, Cornell University, 1998
- Known for: finite group theory, geometric graph theory, symmetries of graphs
- Scientific career
- Fields: Mathematics
- Workplaces: Trinity College (Connecticut), Hamilton College
- Thesis: Centralizers of Finite Subgroups of Automorphisms and Outer Automorphisms of Free Groups (1998)
- Doctoral advisor: Karen Vogtmann
- Website: people.hamilton.edu/dboutin

Debra Lynn Boutin (November 1, 1957 – August 20, 2025) was an American mathematician, the Samuel F. Pratt Professor of Mathematics at Hamilton College, where she chaired the mathematics department. Her research involved the symmetries of graphs and distinguishing colorings of graphs.

== Education ==
Boutin was a 1975 graduate of Chicopee Comprehensive High School in Massachusetts. After high school, Boutin served in the United States Navy and United States Naval Reserve, 1975-1995, retiring as a Chief Petty Officer. She restarted her education, supported by the G.I. Bill, by studying data processing at Springfield Technical Community College in Massachusetts. Next, Boutin went to Smith College as an Ada Comstock Scholar. She was awarded the Science Achievement Award at Smith and the Association for Women in Mathematics Alice T. Schafer Prize (honorable mention), both in 1991. She graduated summa cum laude in 1991 with a bachelor's degree in mathematics. She was elected to Phi Beta Kappa and Sigma Xi in 1991.

She completed her Ph.D. in mathematics in 1998 at Cornell University. Her doctoral dissertation, Centralizers of Finite Subgroups of Automorphisms and Outer Automorphisms of Free Groups, was supervised by Karen Vogtmann.

== Career ==
After a one-year visiting position at Trinity College (Connecticut), Boutin joined Hamilton College in Clinton, New York as an assistant professor in 1999. In 1999-2000 she was selected to be a Project NExT Fellow of the Mathematical Association of America. She was tenured as an associate professor in 2005 and promoted to full professor in 2010. Boutin was awarded a named professorship in 2019 and served as departmental chair from 2022 to 2024. In summers between 2010 and 2018, Professor Boutin was a Research Adjunct at the Institute for Defense Analysis, Center for Communications Research.

== Research ==
Professor Boutin published over 30 research papers in topics ranging from finite group theory, geometric graph theory, to graph symmetries in which she developed the concepts of distinguishing costs and determining numbers of graphs. These papers appear in combinatorics, graph theory, algebra and geometry journals. She was invited and presented her research at conferences nationally and internationally. She had a large set of co-authors internationally and nationally. Her most frequent collaborator was Michael O. Albertson, the Smith College L. Clark Seelye Professor of Mathematics, to whom she was married until his untimely death (m. 1993; died 2009). She was called upon by colleges for professional evaluations, was a referee for over 20 professional journals, and served on committees of the American Mathematical Society and the Society for Industrial and Applied Mathematics; she was elected Secretary of the latter's Discrete Mathematics Activity Group.

== Awards and honors ==
In 2008 Boutin was the inaugural recipient of the Dean's Scholarly Achievement Award for Early Career Achievement and in 2023 the recipient of the Dean's Scholarly Achievement Award for Career Achievement, both from Hamilton College. Hamilton College named Boutin as the Samuel F. Pratt Professor of Mathematics in 2019.

== Selected publications ==
1. Boutin, Debra L., When are Centralizers of Finite Subgroups of Out(F_n) Finite? "Groups, Languages and Geometry". Contemporary Mathematics. Vol. 250. Providence, Rhode Island: American Mathematical Society. 1999. doi:10.1090/conm/250. ISBN 978-0-8218-1053-8. ISSN 1098-3627. MR 1732207.
2. Albertson, Michael O.; Boutin, Debra L., Realizing Finite Groups in Euclidean Space, J. Algebra, 225(2000), no.2, 947-956. MR1741572.
3. Boutin, Debra L., Convex Geometric Graphs with No Short Self-intersecting Paths, Proceedings of the Thirty-Fourth Southeastern International Conference on Combinatorics, Graph Theory and Computing, Congr. Numer. 160(2003). MR2049115.
4. Boutin, Debra L., Identifying Graph Automorphisms Using Determining Sets, Electron. J. Combin., 13(2006), no. 1, Research Paper 78 MR2255420 .
