= Character table =

Two-dimensional group theory table

In group theory, a branch of abstract algebra, a character table is a two-dimensional table whose rows correspond to irreducible representations, and whose columns correspond to conjugacy classes of group elements. The entries consist of characters, the traces of the matrices representing group elements of the column's class in the given row's group representation. In chemistry, crystallography, and spectroscopy, character tables of point groups are used to classify e.g. molecular vibrations according to their symmetry, and to predict whether a transition between two states is forbidden for symmetry reasons. Many university level textbooks on physical chemistry, quantum chemistry, spectroscopy and inorganic chemistry devote a chapter to the use of symmetry group character tables.

== Definition and example ==
The irreducible complex characters of a finite group form a character table which encodes much useful information about the group $G$ in a concise form. Each row is labelled by an irreducible character and the entries in the row are the values of that character on any representative of the respective conjugacy class of $G$ (because characters are class functions). The columns are labelled by (representatives of) the conjugacy classes of $G$. It is customary to label the first row by the character of the trivial representation, which is the trivial action of G on a 1-dimensional vector space by $\rho(g)=1$ for all $g\in G$. Each entry in the first row is therefore 1. Similarly, it is customary to label the first column by the identity. The entries of the first column are the values of the irreducible characters at the identity, the degrees of the irreducible characters. Characters of degree 1 are known as linear characters.

Here is the character table of $C_3 = \langle u\rangle$, the cyclic group with three elements and generator u:

| | ($1$) | ($u$) | ($u^2$) |
| $\mathbf{1}$ | $1$ | $1$ | $1$ |
| $\chi_1$ | $1$ | $\omega$ | $\omega^2$ |
| $\chi_2$ | $1$ | $\omega^2$ | $\omega$ |

where ω is a primitive cube root of unity. The character table for general cyclic groups is (a scalar multiple of) the DFT matrix.

Another example is the character table of $S_3$:

| | (1) | (12) | (123) |
| χ_{triv} | 1 | 1 | 1 |
| χ_{sgn} | 1 | −1 | 1 |
| χ_{stand} | 2 | 0 | −1 |

where (12) represents the conjugacy class consisting of (12), (13), (23), while (123) represents the conjugacy class consisting of (123), (132). To learn more about character table of symmetric groups, see .

The first row of the character table always consists of 1s, and corresponds to the trivial representation (the 1-dimensional representation consisting of 1×1 matrices containing the entry 1). Further, the character table is always square because (1) irreducible characters are pairwise orthogonal, and (2) no other non-trivial class function is orthogonal to every character. (A class function is one that is constant on conjugacy classes.) This is tied to the important fact that the irreducible representations of a finite group G are in bijection with its conjugacy classes. This bijection also follows by showing that the class sums form a basis for the center of the group algebra of G, which has dimension equal to the number of irreducible representations of G.

== Orthogonality relations ==
The space of complex-valued class functions of a finite group G has a natural inner product:

$$\left\langle \alpha, \beta \right\rangle := \frac{1}{\left| G \right|} \sum_{g \in G} \alpha(g) \overline{\beta(g)}$$

where $\overline{\beta(g)}$ denotes the complex conjugate of the value of $\beta$ on $g$. With respect to this inner product, the irreducible characters form an orthonormal basis for the space of class functions, and this yields the orthogonality relation for the rows of the character table:

$$\left\langle \chi_i, \chi_j \right\rangle  = \begin{cases} 0& \mbox{ if } i \ne j, \\ 1& \mbox{ if } i=j. \end{cases}$$

For $g, h \in G$ the orthogonality relation for columns is as follows:

$$\sum_{\chi_i} \chi_i(g) \overline{\chi_i(h)} = \begin{cases} \left| C_G(g) \right|, &\mbox{ if } g, h \mbox{ are conjugate} \\ 0 &\mbox{ otherwise.}\end{cases}$$

where the sum is over all of the irreducible characters $\chi_i$ of G and the symbol $\left| C_G(g) \right|$ denotes the order of the centralizer of $g$.

For an arbitrary character $\chi_i$, it is irreducible if and only if $\left\langle \chi_i, \chi_i \right\rangle = 1$.

The orthogonality relations can aid many computations including:

- Decomposing an unknown character as a linear combination of irreducible characters, i.e. # of copies of irreducible representation V_{i} in $V = \left\langle \chi, \chi_i \right\rangle$.
- Constructing the complete character table when only some of the irreducible characters are known.
- Finding the orders of the centralizers of representatives of the conjugacy classes of a group.
- Finding the order of the group, $\left| G \right| = \left| Cl(g) \right| * \sum_{\chi_i} \chi_i(g) \overline{\chi_i(g)}$, for any g in G.

If the irreducible representation V is non-trivial, then $\sum_g \chi(g) = 0.$

More specifically, consider the regular representation which is the permutation obtained from a finite group G acting on (the free vector space spanned by) itself. The characters of this representation are $\chi(e) = \left| G \right|$ and $\chi(g) = 0$ for $g$ not the identity. Then given an irreducible representation $V_i$,

$$\left\langle \chi_{\text{reg}}, \chi_i \right\rangle = \frac{1}{\left| G \right|}\sum_{g \in G} \chi_i(g) \overline{\chi_{\text{reg}}(g)} = \frac{1}{\left| G \right|} \chi_i(1) \overline{\chi_{\text{reg}}(1)} = \operatorname{dim} V_i$$.

Then decomposing the regular representations as a sum of irreducible representations of G, we get $V_{\text{reg}} = \bigoplus V_i^{\operatorname{dim} V_i}$, from which we conclude

$$|G| = \operatorname{dim} V_{\text{reg}} = \sum(\operatorname{dim} V_i)^2$$

over all irreducible representations $V_i$. This sum can help narrow down the dimensions of the irreducible representations in a character table. For example, if the group has order 10 and 4 conjugacy classes (for instance, the dihedral group of order 10) then the only way to express the order of the group as a sum of four squares is $10 = 1^2 + 1^2 + 2^2 + 2^2$, so we know the dimensions of all the irreducible representations.

== Properties ==
Complex conjugation acts on the character table: since the complex conjugate of a representation is again a representation, the same is true for characters, and thus a character that takes on non-real complex values has a conjugate character.

Certain properties of the group G can be deduced from its character table:

- The order of G is given by the sum of the squares of the entries of the first column (the degrees of the irreducible characters). More generally, the sum of the squares of the absolute values of the entries in any column gives the order of the centralizer of an element of the corresponding conjugacy class.
- All normal subgroups of G (and thus whether or not G is simple) can be recognised from its character table. The kernel of a character χ is the set of elements g in G for which χ(g) = χ(1); this is a normal subgroup of G. Each normal subgroup of G is the intersection of the kernels of some of the irreducible characters of G.
- The number of irreducible representations of G equals the number of conjugacy classes that G has.
- The commutator subgroup of G is the intersection of the kernels of the linear characters of G.
- If G is finite, then since the character table is square and has as many rows as conjugacy classes, it follows that G is abelian iff each conjugacy class has size 1 iff the character table of G is $|G| \!\times\! |G|$ iff each irreducible character is linear.
- It follows, using some results of Richard Brauer from modular representation theory, that the prime divisors of the orders of the elements of each conjugacy class of a finite group can be deduced from its character table (an observation of Graham Higman).

The character table does not in general determine the group up to isomorphism: for example, the quaternion group and the dihedral group of order 8 have the same character table. Brauer asked whether the character table, together with the knowledge of how the powers of elements of its conjugacy classes are distributed, determines a finite group up to isomorphism. In 1964, this was answered in the negative by E. C. Dade.

The linear representations of G are themselves a group under the tensor product, since the tensor product of 1-dimensional vector spaces is again 1-dimensional. That is, if $\rho_1:G \to V_1$ and $\rho_2:G \to V_2$ are linear representations, then $\rho_1\otimes\rho_2(g) = (\rho_1(g)\otimes\rho_2(g))$ defines a new linear representation. This gives rise to a group of linear characters, called the character group under the operation $[\chi_1*\chi_2](g) = \chi_1(g)\chi_2(g)$. This group is connected to Dirichlet characters and Fourier analysis.

== Outer automorphisms ==
The outer automorphism group acts on the character table by permuting columns (conjugacy classes) and accordingly rows, which gives another symmetry to the table. For example, abelian groups have the outer automorphism $g \mapsto g^{-1}$, which is non-trivial except for elementary abelian 2-groups, and outer because abelian groups are precisely those for which conjugation (inner automorphisms) acts trivially. In the example of $C_3$ above, this map sends $u \mapsto u^2, u^2 \mapsto u,$ and accordingly switches $\chi_1$ and $\chi_2$ (switching their values of $\omega$ and $\omega^2$). Note that this particular automorphism (negative in abelian groups) agrees with complex conjugation.

Formally, if $\phi\colon G \to G$ is an automorphism of G and $\rho \colon G \to \operatorname{GL}$ is a representation, then $\rho^\phi := g \mapsto \rho(\phi(g))$ is a representation. If $\phi = \phi_a$ is an inner automorphism (conjugation by some element a), then it acts trivially on representations, because representations are class functions (conjugation does not change their value). Thus a given class of outer automorphisms, it acts on the characters – because inner automorphisms act trivially, the action of the automorphism group $\mathrm{Aut}$ descends to the quotient $\mathrm{Out}$.

This relation can be used both ways: given an outer automorphism, one can produce new representations (if the representation is not equal on conjugacy classes that are interchanged by the outer automorphism), and conversely, one can restrict possible outer automorphisms based on the character table.

== Finding the vibrational modes of a water molecule using character table ==
To find the total number of vibrational modes of a water molecule, the irreducible representation Γ_{irreducible} needs to calculate from the character table of a water molecule first.

=== Finding Γ_{reducible} from the Character Table of H_{²}O molecule ===
Water ($\ce{H2O}$) molecule falls under the point group $C_{2v}$. Below is the character table of $C_{2v}$ point group, which is also the character table for a water molecule.

Character table for $C_{2v}$ point group
| | $E$ | $C_2$ | $\sigma_v$ | $\sigma'_v$ | | |
|---|---|---|---|---|---|---|
| $A_1$ | 1 | 1 | 1 | 1 | $z$ | $x^2,y^2,z^2$ |
| $A_2$ | 1 | 1 | −1 | −1 | $R_z$ | $xy$ |
| $B_1$ | 1 | −1 | 1 | −1 | $R_y,x$ | $xz$ |
| $B_2$ | 1 | −1 | −1 | 1 | $R_x,y$ | $yz$ |

In here, the first row describes the possible symmetry operations of this point group and the first column represents the Mulliken symbols. The fifth and sixth columns are functions of the axis variables.

Functions:

- $x$, $y$ and $z$ are related to translational movement and IR active bands.
- $R_x$, $R_y$ and $R_z$ are related to rotation about respective axis.
- Quadratic functions (such as $x^2+y^2$, $x^2-y^2$, $x^2$, $y^2$,$z^2$, $xy$, $yz$,$zx$) are related to Raman active bands.

When determining the characters for a representation, assign $1$ if it remains unchanged, $0$ if it moved, and $-1$ if it reversed its direction. A simple way to determine the characters for the reducible representation $\Gamma_{\text{reducible}}$, is to multiply the "number of unshifted atom(s)" with "contribution per atom" along each of three axes ($x,y,z$) when a symmetry operation is carried out.

Unless otherwise stated, for the identity operation $E$, "contribution per unshifted atom" for each atom is always $3$, as none of the atom(s) change their position during this operation. For any reflective symmetry operation $\sigma$, "contribution per atom" is always $1$, as for any reflection, an atom remains unchanged along with two axes and reverse its direction along with the other axis. For the inverse symmetry operation $i$, "contribution per unshifted atom" is always $-3$, as each of three axes of an atom reverse its direction during this operation. An easy way to calculate "contribution per unshifted atom" for $C_n$ and $S_n$ symmetry operation is to use below formulas

$$C_n = 2\cos\theta+1$$
$$S_n = 2\cos\theta-1$$

where, $\theta = \frac{360}{n}$

A simplified version of above statements is summarized in the table below

| Operation | Contribution per unshifted atom |
|---|---|
| $E$ | 3 |
| $C_2$ | −1 |
| $C_3$ | 0 |
| $C_4$ | 1 |
| $C_6$ | 2 |
| $\sigma_{xy/yz/zx}$ | 1 |
| $i$ | −3 |
| $S_3$ | −2 |
| $S_4$ | −1 |
| $S_6$ | 0 |

Character of $\Gamma_{\text{reducible}}$ for any symmetry operation $=$ Number of unshifted atom(s) during this operation $\times$ Contribution per unshifted atom along each of three axes

Finding the characters for $\Gamma_{\text{red}}$
| $C_{2v}$ | $E$ | $C_2$ | $\sigma_{v(xz)}$ | $\sigma'_{v(yz)}$ |
|---|---|---|---|---|
| Number of unshifted atom(s) | 3 | 1 | 3 | 1 |
| Contribution per unshifted atom | 3 | −1 | 1 | 1 |
| $\Gamma_{\text{red}}$ | 9 | −1 | 3 | 1 |

=== Calculating the irreducible representation Γ_{irreducible} from the reducible representation Γ_{reducible} along with the character table ===
From the above discussion, a new character table for a water molecule ($C_{2v}$ point group) can be written as

New character table for $\ce{H2O}$ molecule including $\Gamma_{\text{red}}$
| | $E$ | $C_2$ | $\sigma_{v(xz)}$ | $\sigma'_{v(yz)}$ |
|---|---|---|---|---|
| $A_1$ | 1 | 1 | 1 | 1 |
| $A_2$ | 1 | 1 | −1 | −1 |
| $B_1$ | 1 | −1 | 1 | −1 |
| $B_2$ | 1 | −1 | −1 | 1 |
| $\Gamma_{\text{red}}$ | 9 | −1 | 3 | 1 |

Using the new character table including $\Gamma_{\text{red}}$, the reducible representation for all motion of the $\ce{H2O}$ molecule can be reduced using below formula

$$N = \frac{1}{h}\sum_{x}(X^x_i \times X^x_r\times n^x)$$

where,

$h =$ order of the group,
$X^x_i =$ character of the $\Gamma_{\text{reducible}}$ for a particular class,
$X^x_r =$ character from the reducible representation for a particular class,
$n^x =$ the number of operations in the class

So,

$N_{A_1} = \frac{1}{4}[(9\times 1\times 1)+((-1)\times 1\times 1)+(3\times 1\times 1)+(1\times 1\times 1)] = 3$

$N_{A_2} = \frac{1}{4}[(9\times 1\times 1+((-1)\times 1\times 1)+(3\times(-1)\times 1)+(1\times(-1)\times 1)] = 1$

$N_{B_1} = \frac{1}{4}[(9\times 1\times 1)+((-1)\times(-1)\times 1)+(3\times 1\times 1)+(1\times(-1)\times 1)] = 3$

$N_{B_2} = \frac{1}{4}[(9\times 1\times 1)+((-1)\times(-1)\times 1)+(3\times(-1)\times 1)+(1\times 1\times 1)] = 2$

So, the reduced representation for all motions of water molecule will be

$\Gamma_{\text{irreducible}} = 3A_1 + A_2 + 3B_1 + 2B_2$

=== Translational motion for water molecule ===
Translational motion will correspond with the reducible representations in the character table, which have $x$, $y$ and $z$ function

For $\ce{H2O}$molecule
| $A_1$ | $z$ |
| $A_2$ | |
| $B_1$ | $x$ |
| $B_2$ | $y$ |

As only the reducible representations $B_1$, $B_2$ and $A_1$ correspond to the $x$, $y$ and $z$ function,

$\Gamma_{\text{translational}} = A_1 + B_1 + B_2$

=== Rotational motion for water molecule ===
Rotational motion will correspond with the reducible representations in the character table, which have $R_x$, $R_y$ and $R_z$ function

For $\ce{H2O}$ molecule
| $A_1$ | |
| $A_2$ | $R_z$ |
| $B_1$ | $R_y$ |
| $B_2$ | $R_x$ |

As only the reducible representations $B_2$, $B_1$ and $A_2$ correspond to the $x$, $y$ and $z$ function,

$\Gamma_{\text{rotational}} = A_2 + B_1 + B_2$

=== Total vibrational modes for water molecule ===
Total vibrational mode, $\Gamma_{\text{vibrational}} = \Gamma_{\text{irreducible}} - \Gamma_{\text{translational}} - \Gamma_{\text{rotational}}$

$= (3A_1 + A_2 + 3B_1 + 2B_2) - (A_1 + B_1 + B_2) - (A_2 + B_1 + B_2)$

$= 2A_1 + B_1$

So, total $2+1 = 3$ vibrational modes are possible for water molecules and two of them are symmetric vibrational modes (as $2A_1$) and the other vibrational mode is antisymmetric (as $1B_1$)

=== Checking whether the water molecule is IR active or Raman active ===
There is some rules to be IR active or Raman active for a particular mode.

- If there is a $x$, $y$ or $z$ for any irreducible representation, then the mode is IR active
- If there is a quadratic functions such as $x^2+y^2$, $x^2-y^2$, $x^2$, $y^2$,$z^2$, $xy$, $yz$ or $xz$ for any irreducible representation, then the mode is Raman active
- If there is no $x$, $y$, $z$ nor quadratic functions for any irreducible representation, then the mode is neither IR active nor Raman active

As the vibrational modes for water molecule $\Gamma_{\text{vibrational}}$ contains both $x$, $y$ or $z$ and quadratic functions, it has both the IR active vibrational modes and Raman active vibrational modes.

Similar rules will apply for rest of the irreducible representations $\Gamma_{\text{irreducible}}, \Gamma_{\text{translational}}, \Gamma_{\text{rotational}}$

== Finding the vibrational modes of the ethylene molecule using character table ==
Ethylene is a member of the D2h point group, which has eight Mulliken symbols in the first column. Besides, the ethylene molecule contains six atoms, each with an x, y, and z axis. So, the molecule has a total of 18 axes.

For vibrational modes of the molecule, it is necessary to calculate the irreducible representation Γ_{irreducible}. Also, the irreducible representation is related with the reducible representation.

Here is another method to calculate the representation calculation. It is necessary to find the change of x, y and z axes. If the atom changes the place after the operation, there is no contribution to the Γ_{reducible}. If the atom keeps the same place after the operation, then check the axis, if the axis keeps same direction, the contribution to the Γ_{reducible}.is 1; if the axis reverses to the opposite direction, the contribution to the Γ_{reducible}.is -1; if the axis rotates at a certain angle θ, the contribution is cos θ. After calculating all axes of all atoms, there is the value of the reducible representation Γ_{reducible} for this operation. In this case, ethylene is the D_{2h} point group with eight symmetry operations in the first line, each operation provides the different Γ_{reducible}.

E: Identity Symmetry. All atoms remain in their original positions, so they all have the same x, y, and z axes. The 18 axes remain in the same position, each contributing one to the reducible. The reducible number for E is 18.

C_{2}(x), C_{2}(y): As the molecule rotates along the x or y axis, each atom moves and contributes zero to the reducible. The overall Γ_{reducible} for C2(x) and C2(y) are 0.

C_{2}(z): The molecule rotates along the z axis, with only two carbon atoms remaining in the same position. The x and y axes of each carbon atom reverse to the opposite place, but z axis keeps the same direction, contributing negative one of each atom. The overall Γ_{reducible} is -2.

i: The molecule is inverse through the center. Since all atoms move places, the overall Γ_{reducible} for i is 0.

σ(xy): The molecule flips across the xy plane. The overall Γ_{reducible} for σ(xy) is 0, as all atoms move places.

σ(xz): The molecule flips across the xz plane, but two carbon atoms remain in the same place. The x and z axes remain unchanged, each contributing to a single reducible number. However, the y axis reverses and contributes to negative one Γ_{reducible}. So, each carbon contributes one Γ_{reducible}, the overall Γ_{reducible} is 2.

σ(yz): It is different from other operations. All six atoms maintain their original positions. The y and z axes remain the same, but the x axis reverses, resulting in one Γ_{reducible} for each atom. The total Γ_{reducible} is 6.

New character table for ethylene $\Gamma_{\text{red}}$

| | E | C_{2}(x) | C_{2}(y) | C_{2}(z) | i | σ(xy) | σ(xz) | σ(yz) |
| Γ_{reducible} | 18 | 0 | 0 | -2 | 0 | 0 | 2 | 6 |

The next step is to calculate the irreducible presentation based on the reducible presentation. Here is the calculation.

NAg=18[(18×1×1)+0+0+((−2)×1×1)+0+0+(2×1×1)+(6×1×1)]=3NB1g=18[(18×1×1)+0+0+((−2)×1×1)+0+0+(2×1×(−1))+(6×1×(−1))]=1NB2g=18[(18×1×1)+0+0+((−2)×1×(−1))+0+0+(2×1×1)+(6×1×(−1))]=2NB3g=18[(18×1×1)+0+0+((−2)×1×(−1))+0+0+(2×1×(−1))+(6×1×1)]=3

NAu=18[(18×1×1)+0+0+((−2)×1×1)+0+0+(2×1×(−1))+(6×1×(−1))]=1

NB1u=18[(18×1×1)+0+0+((−2)×1×1)+0+0+(2×1×1)+(6×1×1)]=3

NB2u=18[(18×1×1)+0+0+((−2)×1×(−1))+0+0+(2×1×(−1))+(6×1×1)]=3

NB3u=18[(18×1×1)+0+0+((−2)×1×(−1))+0+0+(2×1×1)+(6×1×(−1))]=2

Γ_{irreducible} = 3A_{g}+1B_{1g}+2B_{2g}+3B_{3g}+1A_{u}+3B_{1u}+3B_{2u}+2B_{3u}

Translational motion has x, y and z functions in “linear functions, roatations”. So, Γ_{trans} = 1B_{1u}+1B_{2u}+1B_{3u}

Rotational motion has R_{x}, R_{y} and R_{z} functions in “linear functions, roatations”. So, Γ_{rot} = 1B_{1g}+1B_{2g}+1B_{3g}

Vibrational motio: Γ_{vib} = Γ_{irreducible}-Γ_{trans}-Γ_{rot} = 3A_{g}+1B_{2g}+2B_{3g}+1A_{u}+2B_{1u}+2B_{2u}+1B_{3u}

The final step is to determine which vibrations are IR or Raman active. This means that the symmetry operation can be detected using the infrared or Raman spectrum.

First, for IR to work, they must have x, y, and z functions in "linear functions, rotations". In Γ_{vib}, only 2B_{1u}+2B_{2u}+1B_{3u} are IR active.

To be Raman active, "quadratic functions" must include x^{2}, y^{2}, z^{2},xy, xz, yz, x^{2}+y^{2} or x^{2}-y^{2} functions. In Γ_{vib}, only 3A_{g}+1B_{2g}+2B_{3g} are Raman active.

== See also ==
- Irreducible representation § Applications in theoretical physics and chemistry
- Molecular symmetry
- List of character tables for chemically important 3D point groups
- Character tables of small groups on GroupNames
- Isaacs, I. Martin (1976). Character Theory of Finite Groups. Dover Publications.
- Rowland, Todd; Weisstein, Eric W. "Character Table". MathWorld.
