= Karen Vogtmann =

American mathematician

Karen Vogtmann FRS
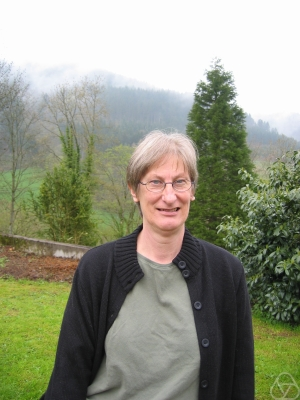
- Born: July 13, 1949 (age 77); Pittsburg, California
- Education: Ph.D., 1977 University of California, Berkeley
- Known for: Culler–Vogtmann Outer space
- Awards: 2006, International Congress of Mathematicians invited lecture; 2007, Noether Lecture; 2014, Royal Society Wolfson Research Merit Award; 2014, Humboldt Prize; 2016, European Congress of Mathematics plenary talk
- Scientific career
- Fields: geometric group theory; algebraic K-theory
- Workplaces: Cornell University; University of Warwick
- Thesis: Homology stability for 0n,n (1977)
- Doctoral advisor: John Bason Wagoner
- Doctoral students: Debra Boutin; Martin Bridson

Karen Vogtmann FRS (born July 13, 1949 in Pittsburg, California) is an American mathematician working primarily in the area of geometric group theory. She introduced, in a 1986 paper with Marc Culler, an object now known as the Culler–Vogtmann Outer space. The Outer space is a free group analog of the Teichmüller space of a Riemann surface and is particularly useful in the study of the group of outer automorphisms of the free group on n generators, Out(F_{n}). Vogtmann is a professor of mathematics at Cornell University and the University of Warwick.

== Biographical data ==
Vogtmann was inspired to pursue mathematics by a National Science Foundation summer program for high school students at the University of California, Berkeley.

She received a B.A. from the University of California, Berkeley in 1971. Vogtmann then obtained a PhD in mathematics, also from the University of California, Berkeley in 1977. Her PhD advisor was John Wagoner and her doctoral thesis was on algebraic K-theory.

She then held positions at University of Michigan, Brandeis University and Columbia University. Vogtmann has been a faculty member at Cornell University since 1984, and she became a full professor at Cornell in 1994. In September 2013, she also joined the University of Warwick. She is married to the mathematician John Smillie. The couple moved in 2013 to England and settled in Kenilworth. She is currently a professor of mathematics at Warwick, and a Goldwin Smith Professor of Mathematics Emeritus at Cornell.

Vogtmann has been the vice-president of the American Mathematical Society (2003–2006). She has been elected to serve as a member of the board of trustees of the American Mathematical Society for the period February 2008 – January 2018.

Vogtmann is a former editorial board member (2006–2016) of the journal Algebraic and Geometric Topology and a former associate editor of Bulletin of the American Mathematical Society. She is currently an associate editor of the Journal of the American Mathematical Society, an editorial board member Geometry & Topology Monographs book series, and a consulting editor for the Proceedings of the Edinburgh Mathematical Society.

She is also a member of the ArXiv advisory board.

Since 1986 Vogtmann has been a co-organizer of the annual conference called the Cornell Topology Festival that usually takes places at Cornell University each May.

=== Awards, honors and other recognition ===
Vogtmann gave an invited lecture at the International Congress of Mathematicians in Madrid, Spain, in August 2006.

She gave the 2007 annual AWM Noether Lecture titled "Automorphisms of Free Groups, Outer Space and Beyond" at the annual meeting of American Mathematical Society in New Orleans in January 2007. Vogtmann was selected to deliver the Noether Lecture for "her fundamental contributions to geometric group theory; in particular, to the study of the automorphism group of a free group".

On June 21–25, 2010 a 'VOGTMANNFEST' Geometric Group Theory conference in honor of Vogtmann's birthday was held in Luminy, France.

In 2012 she became a fellow of the American Mathematical Society. She became a member of the Academia Europaea in 2020. She was elected to the American Academy of Arts and Sciences in 2023.

Vogtmann received the Royal Society Wolfson Research Merit Award in 2014. She also received the Humboldt Research Award from the Humboldt Foundation in 2014. She was named MSRI Clay Senior Scholar in 2016 and Simons Professor for 2016-2017.

Vogtmann gave a plenary talk at the 2016 European Congress of Mathematics in Berlin.

In 2018 she won the Pólya Prize of the London Mathematical Society "for her profound and pioneering work in geometric group theory, particularly the study of automorphism groups of free groups".

In May 2021 she was elected a Fellow of the Royal Society.

In 2022 she was elected to the National Academy of Sciences (NAS).

== Mathematical contributions ==
Vogtmann's early work concerned homological properties of orthogonal groups associated to quadratic forms over various fields.

Vogtmann's most important contribution came in a 1986 paper with Marc Culler called "Moduli of graphs and automorphisms of free groups". The paper introduced an object that came to be known as Culler–Vogtmann Outer space. The Outer space X_{n}, associated to a free group F_{n}, is a free group analog of the Teichmüller space of a Riemann surface. Instead of marked conformal structures (or, in an equivalent model, hyperbolic structures) on a surface, points of the Outer space are represented by volume-one marked metric graphs. A marked metric graph consists of a homotopy equivalence between a wedge of n circles and a finite connected graph Γ without degree-one and degree-two vertices, where Γ is equipped with a volume-one metric structure, that is, assignment of positive real lengths to edges of Γ so that the sum of the lengths of all edges is equal to one. Points of X_{n} can also be thought of as free and discrete minimal isometric actions F_{n} on real trees where the quotient graph has volume one.

By construction the Outer space X_{n} is a finite-dimensional simplicial complex equipped with a natural action of Out(F_{n}) which is properly discontinuous and has finite simplex stabilizers. The main result of Culler–Vogtmann 1986 paper, obtained via Morse-theoretic methods, was that the Outer space X_{n} is contractible. Thus the quotient space X_{n} /Out(F_{n}) is "almost" a classifying space for Out(F_{n}) and it can be thought of as a classifying space over Q. Moreover, Out(F_{n}) is known to be virtually torsion-free, so for any torsion-free subgroup H of Out(F_{n}) the action of H on X_{n} is discrete and free, so that X_{n}/H is a classifying space for H. For these reasons the Outer space is a particularly useful object in obtaining homological and cohomological information about Out(F_{n}). In particular, Culler and Vogtmann proved that Out(F_{n}) has virtual cohomological dimension 2n − 3.

In their 1986 paper Culler and Vogtmann do not assign X_{n} a specific name. According to Vogtmann, the term Outer space for the complex X_{n} was later coined by Peter Shalen. In subsequent years the Outer space became a central object in the study of Out(F_{n}). In particular, the Outer space has a natural compactification, similar to Thurston's compactification of the Teichmüller space, and studying the action of Out(F_{n}) on this compactification yields interesting information about dynamical properties of automorphisms of free groups.

Much of Vogtmann's subsequent work concerned the study of the Outer space X_{n}, particularly its homotopy, homological and cohomological properties, and related questions for Out(F_{n}). For example, Hatcher and Vogtmann obtained a number of homological stability results for Out(F_{n}) and Aut(F_{n}).

In her papers with Conant, Vogtmann explored the connection found by Maxim Kontsevich between the cohomology of certain infinite-dimensional Lie algebras and the homology of Out(F_{n}).

A 2001 paper of Vogtmann, joint with Louis Billera and Susan P. Holmes, used the ideas of geometric group theory and CAT(0) geometry to study the space of phylogenetic trees, that is trees showing possible evolutionary relationships between different species. Identifying precise evolutionary trees is an important basic problem in mathematical biology and one also needs to have good quantitative tools for estimating how accurate a particular evolutionary tree is. The paper of Billera, Vogtmann and Holmes produced a method for quantifying the difference between two evolutionary trees, effectively determining the distance between them. The fact that the space of phylogenetic trees has "non-positively curved geometry", particularly the uniqueness of shortest paths or geodesics in CAT(0) spaces, allows using these results for practical statistical computations of estimating the confidence level of how accurate particular evolutionary tree is. A free software package implementing these algorithms has been developed and is actively used by biologists.

== Selected works ==
- Vogtmann, Karen (1981), "Spherical posets and homology stability for O_{n,n}" (PDF), Topology, 20 (2): 119–132, doi:10.1016/0040-9383(81)90032-x, MR 0605652, archived from the original (PDF) on September 14, 2006
- Culler, Marc; Vogtmann, Karen (1986), "Moduli of graphs and automorphisms of free groups" (PDF), Inventiones Mathematicae, 84 (1): 91–119, Bibcode:1986InMat..84...91C, doi:10.1007/BF01388734, MR 0830040, S2CID 122869546, archived from the original (PDF) on September 13, 2006
- Hatcher, Allen; Vogtmann, Karen (1998), "Cerf theory for graphs", Journal of the London Mathematical Society, Series 2, 58 (3): 633–655, doi:10.1112/s0024610798006644, MR 1678155, S2CID 15231486
- Billera, Louis J.; Holmes, Susan P.; Vogtmann, Karen (2001). "A Grove of Evolutionary Trees". Advances in Applied Mathematics. 27 (4): 733–767. doi:10.1006/aama.2001.0759. MR 1867931. Archived from the original on February 27, 2012.
- Conant, James; Vogtmann, Karen (2004), "Morita classes in the homology of automorphism groups of free groups" (PDF), Geometry & Topology, 8 (3): 1471–1499, arXiv:math/0406389, Bibcode:2004math......6389C, doi:10.2140/gt.2004.8.1471, MR 2119302, S2CID 3131626

== See also ==
- Geometric group theory
- Teichmüller space
- Mapping class group
- Train track map
