= Train track map =

Homotopic map of a graph

In the mathematical subject of geometric group theory, a train track map is a continuous map f from a finite connected graph to itself which is a homotopy equivalence and which has particularly nice cancellation properties with respect to iterations. This map sends vertices to vertices and edges to nontrivial edge-paths with the property that for every edge e of the graph and for every positive integer n the path f^{n}(e) is immersed, that is f^{n}(e) is locally injective on e. Train-track maps are a key tool in analyzing the dynamics of automorphisms of finitely generated free groups and in the study of the Culler–Vogtmann Outer space.

== History ==
Train track maps for free group automorphisms were introduced in a 1992 paper of Bestvina and Handel. The notion was motivated by Thurston's train tracks on surfaces, but the free group case is substantially different and more complicated. In their 1992 paper Bestvina and Handel proved that every irreducible automorphism of F_{n} has a train-track representative. In the same paper they introduced the notion of a relative train track and applied train track methods to solve the Scott conjecture which says that for every automorphism α of a finitely generated free group F_{n} the fixed subgroup of α is free of rank at most n. In a subsequent paper Bestvina and Handel applied the train track techniques to obtain an effective proof of Thurston's classification of homeomorphisms of compact surfaces (with or without boundary) which says that every such homeomorphism is, up to isotopy, either reducible, of finite order or pseudo-anosov.

Since then train tracks became a standard tool in the study of algebraic, geometric and dynamical properties of automorphisms of free groups and of subgroups of Out(F_{n}). Train tracks are particularly useful since they allow to understand long-term growth (in terms of length) and cancellation behavior for large iterates of an automorphism of F_{n} applied to a particular conjugacy class in F_{n}. This information is especially helpful when studying the dynamics of the action of elements of Out(F_{n}) on the Culler–Vogtmann Outer space and its boundary and when studying F_{n} actions of on real trees. Examples of applications of train tracks include: a theorem of Brinkmann proving that for an automorphism α of F_{n} the mapping torus group of α is word-hyperbolic if and only if α has no periodic conjugacy classes; a theorem of Bridson and Groves that for every automorphism α of F_{n} the mapping torus group of α satisfies a quadratic isoperimetric inequality; a proof of algorithmic solvability of the conjugacy problem for free-by-cyclic groups; and others.

Train tracks were a key tool in the proof by Bestvina, Feighn and Handel that the group Out(F_{n}) satisfies the Tits alternative.

The machinery of train tracks for injective endomorphisms of free groups was later developed by Dicks and Ventura.

== Formal definition ==
=== Combinatorial map ===
For a finite graph Γ (which is thought of here as a 1-dimensional cell complex) a combinatorial map is a continuous map

f : Γ → Γ

such that:

- The map f takes vertices to vertices.
- For every edge e of Γ its image f(e) is a nontrivial edge-path e_{1}...e_{m} in Γ where m ≥ 1. Moreover, e can be subdivided into m intervals such that the interior of the i-th interval is mapped by f homeomorphically onto the interior of the edge e_{i} for i = 1,...,m.

=== Train track map ===
Let Γ be a finite connected graph. A combinatorial map f : Γ → Γ is called a train track map if for every edge e of Γ and every integer n ≥ 1 the edge-path f^{n}(e) contains no backtracks, that is, it contains no subpaths of the form hh^{−1} where h is an edge of Γ. In other words, the restriction of f^{n} to e is locally injective (or an immersion) for every edge e and every n ≥ 1.

When applied to the case n = 1, this definition implies, in particular, that the path f(e) has no backtracks.

=== Topological representative ===
Let F_{k} be a free group of finite rank k ≥ 2. Fix a free basis A of F_{k} and an identification of F_{k} with the fundamental group of the rose R_{k} which is a wedge of k circles corresponding to the basis elements of A.

Let φ ∈ Out(F_{k}) be an outer automorphism of F_{k}.

A topological representative of φ is a triple (τ, Γ, f) where:

- Γ is a finite connected graph with the first betti number k (so that the fundamental group of Γ is free of rank k).
- τ : R_{k} → Γ is a homotopy equivalence (which, in this case, means that τ is a continuous map which induces an isomorphism at the level of fundamental groups).
- f : Γ → Γ is a combinatorial map which is also a homotopy equivalence.
- If σ : Γ → R_{k} is a homotopy inverse of τ then the composition

σfτ : R_{k} → R_{k}
induces an automorphism of F_{k} = π_{1}(R_{k}) whose outer automorphism class is equal to φ.

The map τ in the above definition is called a marking and is typically suppressed when topological representatives are discussed. Thus, by abuse of notation, one often says that in the above situation f : Γ → Γ is a topological representative of φ.

=== Train track representative ===
Let φ ∈ Out(F_{k}) be an outer automorphism of F_{k}. A train track map which is a topological representative of φ is called a train track representative of φ.

=== Legal and illegal turns ===
Let f : Γ → Γ be a combinatorial map. A turn is an unordered pair e, h of oriented edges of Γ (not necessarily distinct) having a common initial vertex. A turn e, h is degenerate if e = h and nondegenerate otherwise.

A turn e, h is illegal if for some n ≥ 1 the paths f^{n}(e) and f^{n}(h) have a nontrivial common initial segment (that is, they start with the same edge). A turn is legal if it not illegal.

An edge-path e_{1},..., e_{m} is said to contain turns e_{i}^{−1}, e_{i+1} for i = 1,...,m−1.

A combinatorial map f : Γ → Γ is a train-track map if and only if for every edge e of Γ the path f(e) contains no illegal turns.

=== Derivative map ===
Let f : Γ → Γ be a combinatorial map and let E be the set of oriented edges of Γ. Then f determines its derivative map Df : E → E where for every edge e Df(e) is the initial edge of the path f(e). The map Df naturally extends to the map Df : T → T where T is the set of all turns in Γ. For a turn t given by an edge-pair e, h, its image Df(t) is the turn Df(e), Df(h). A turn t is legal if and only if for every n ≥ 1 the turn (Df)^{n}(t) is nondegenerate. Since the set T of turns is finite, this fact allows one to algorithmically determine if a given turn is legal or not and hence to algorithmically decide, given f, whether or not f is a train-track map.

== Examples ==
Let φ be the automorphism of F(a,b) given by φ(a) = b, φ(b) = ab. Let Γ be the wedge of two loop-edges E_{a} and E_{b} corresponding to the free basis elements a and b, wedged at the vertex v. Let f : Γ → Γ be the map which fixes v and sends the edge E_{a} to E_{b} and that sends the edge E_{b} to the edge-path E_{a}E_{b}. Then f is a train track representative of φ.

== Main result for irreducible automorphisms ==
=== Irreducible automorphisms ===
An outer automorphism φ of F_{k} is said to be reducible if there exists a free product decomposition

$$F_k=H_1\ast\dots H_m\ast U$$

where all H_{i} are nontrivial, where m ≥ 1 and where φ permutes the conjugacy classes of H_{1},...,H_{m} in F_{k}. An outer automorphism φ of F_{k} is said to be irreducible if it is not reducible.

It is known that φ ∈ Out(F_{k}) be irreducible if and only if for every topological representative f : Γ → Γ of φ, where Γ is finite, connected and without degree-one vertices, any proper f-invariant subgraph of Γ is a forest.

=== Bestvina–Handel theorem for irreducible automorphisms ===
The following result was obtained by Bestvina and Handel in their 1992 paper where train track maps were originally introduced:

Let φ ∈ Out(F_{k}) be irreducible. Then there exists a train track representative of φ.

==== Sketch of the proof ====
For a topological representative f:Γ→Γ of an automorphism φ of F_{k} the transition matrix M(f) is an rxr matrix (where r is the number of topological edges of Γ) where the entry m_{ij} is the number of times the path f(e_{j}) passes through the edge e_{i} (in either direction). If φ is irreducible, the transition matrix M(f) is irreducible in the sense of the Perron–Frobenius theorem and it has a unique Perron–Frobenius eigenvalue λ(f) ≥ 1 which is equal to the spectral radius of M(f).

One then defines a number of different moves on topological representatives of φ that are all seen to either decrease or preserve the Perron–Frobenius eigenvalue of the transition matrix. These moves include: subdividing an edge; valence-one homotopy (getting rid of a degree-one vertex); valence-two homotopy (getting rid of a degree-two vertex); collapsing an invariant forest; and folding. Of these moves the valence-one homotopy always reduced the Perron–Frobenius eigenvalue.

Starting with some topological representative f of an irreducible automorphism φ one then algorithmically constructs a sequence of topological representatives

f = f_{1}, f_{2}, f_{3},...

of φ where f_{n} is obtained from f_{n−1} by several moves, specifically chosen. In this sequence, if f_{n} is not a train track map, then the moves producing f_{n+1} from f_{n} necessarily involve a sequence of folds followed by a valence-one homotopy, so that the Perron–Frobenius eigenvalue of f_{n+1} is strictly smaller than that of f_{n}. The process is arranged in such a way that Perron–Frobenius eigenvalues of the maps f_{n} take values in a discrete substet of $\mathbb R$. This guarantees that the process terminates in a finite number of steps and the last term f_{N} of the sequence is a train track representative of φ.

==== Applications to growth ====
A consequence (requiring additional arguments) of the above theorem is the following:

- If φ ∈ Out(F_{k}) is irreducible then the Perron–Frobenius eigenvalue λ(f) does not depend on the choice of a train track representative f of φ but is uniquely determined by φ itself and is denoted by λ(φ). The number λ(φ) is called the growth rate of φ.
- If φ ∈ Out(F_{k}) is irreducible and of infinite order then λ(φ) > 1. Moreover, in this case for every free basis X of F_{k} and for most nontrivial values of w ∈ F_{k} there exists C ≥ 1 such that for all n ≥ 1

$$\frac{1}{C}\lambda^n(\phi) \le ||\phi^n(w)||_X\le C \lambda^n(\phi),$$
where ||u||_{X} is the cyclically reduced length of an element u of F_{k} with respect to X. The only exceptions occur when F_{k} corresponds to the fundamental group of a compact surface with boundary S, and φ corresponds to a pseudo-Anosov homeomorphism of S, and w corresponds to a path going around a component of the boundary of S.

Unlike for elements of mapping class groups, for an irreducible φ ∈ Out(F_{k}) it is often the case that

λ(φ) ≠ λ(φ^{−1}).

== Applications and generalizations ==
- The first major application of train tracks was given in the original 1992 paper of Bestvina and Handel where train tracks were introduced. The paper gave a proof of the Scott conjecture which says that for every automorphism α of a finitely generated free group F_{n} the fixed subgroup of α is free of rank at most n.
- In a subsequent paper Bestvina and Handel applied the train track techniques to obtain an effective proof of Thurston's classification of homeomorphisms of compact surfaces (with or without boundary) which says that every such homeomorphism is, up to isotopy, is either reducible, of finite order or pseudo-anosov.
- Train tracks are the main tool in Los' algorithm for deciding whether or not two irreducible elements of Out(F_{n}) are conjugate in Out(F_{n}).
- A theorem of Brinkmann proving that for an automorphism α of F_{n} the mapping torus group of α is word-hyperbolic if and only if α has no periodic conjugacy classes.
- A theorem of Levitt and Lustig showing that a fully irreducible automorphism of a F_{n} has "north-south" dynamics when acting on the Thurston-type compactification of the Culler–Vogtmann Outer space.
- A theorem of Bridson and Groves that for every automorphism α of F_{n} the mapping torus group of α satisfies a quadratic isoperimetric inequality.
- The proof by Bestvina, Feighn and Handel that the group Out(F_{n}) satisfies the Tits alternative.
- An algorithm that, given an automorphism α of F_{n}, decides whether or not the fixed subgroup of α is trivial and finds a finite generating set for that fixed subgroup.
- The proof of algorithmic solvability of the conjugacy problem for free-by-cyclic groups by Bogopolski, Martino, Maslakova, and Ventura.
- The machinery of train tracks for injective endomorphisms of free groups, generalizing the case of automorphisms, was developed in a 1996 book of Dicks and Ventura.

== See also ==
- Geometric group theory
- Real tree
- Mapping class group
- Free group
- Out(F_{n})
