= Chicopee Comprehensive High School =

Public school in Massachusetts, United States

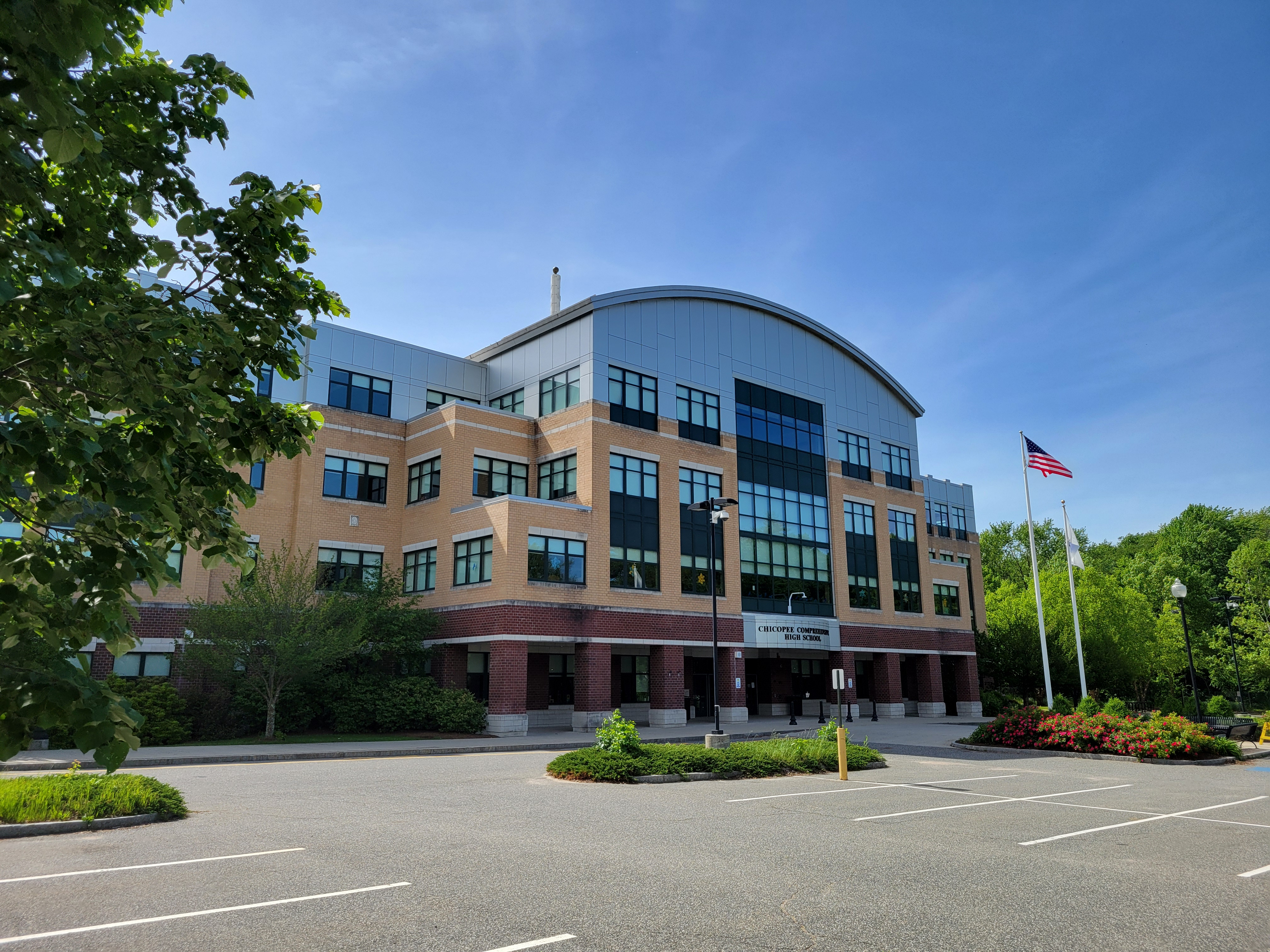
- Chicopee Comprehensive High School

Location
- 617 Montgomery Street; Chicopee, Massachusetts, 01020; United States; 42°10′34″N 72°35′32″W

Information
- Type: Public; Open enrollment
- Established: 1967
- School district: Chicopee Public Schools
- Principal: Andrew Lamothe
- Faculty: 140 (on FTE basis)
- Grades: 9–12
- Enrollment: 1,192 (2024–2025)
- Student to teacher ratio: 06.7
- Colors: Blue and gold
- Athletics conference: Western Mass Conference
- Mascot: Colt
- Nickname: "Comp"
- Rival: Chicopee High School
- Website: comp.chicopeeps.org

Chicopee Comprehensive High School (CCHS) is a public high school educating children in grades 9 to 12, which is located in Chicopee, Massachusetts, United States. Its official school colors are blue and gold. The school's mascot is the "Colt".

== Sports ==
On December 2, 2006, the CCHS football team won the Div.2A Super Bowl title. In the spring of 2009, the CCHS outdoor track and field team took third place at the Western Massachusetts level and sent five athletes to the All-State competition. In 2010 Chicopee Comp's boys volleyball team won the state championship.

Baseball coach Dan Dulchinos retired at the end of the 2012 season after a tenure of 50 years; he began when CCHS opened in 1962. His teams had over 600 wins, including four Western Massachusetts Championships. He is an inaugural member of the Western Massachusetts Baseball Hall of Fame.

== Notable alumni ==
- Debra Boutin, mathematician
- Evelyn C. Leeper, twelve-time Hugo Award nominee for Best Fan Writer
- Victoria Principal, actress, did not graduate from CCHS
- Rick Purcell, candidate for Lieutenant Governor in 2010
