= Rick Purcell =

American politician

Richard P. Purcell (born December 21, 1959) is an American politician from Massachusetts. A member of the Green-Rainbow Party, Purcell was Dr. Jill Stein's running mate during the 2010 Massachusetts gubernatorial election. Purcell was born in 1959 in Albuquerque, New Mexico and grew up on the Tohajiilee Indian Reservation in New Mexico, Purcell moved to Holyoke, Massachusetts in 1974 and graduated from Chicopee Comprehensive High School in 1977. He works as an ergonomics specialist with Baystate Medical Center in Springfield, Massachusetts. Purcell served as a buck sergeant during the Gulf War. He was also stationed in Korea and Germany. Purcell also sought election to the Holyoke City Council in 2002, 2007, and 2011. He is now trying to run for City Council At-Large in 2013.
