= Mladen Bestvina =

Croatian-American mathematician

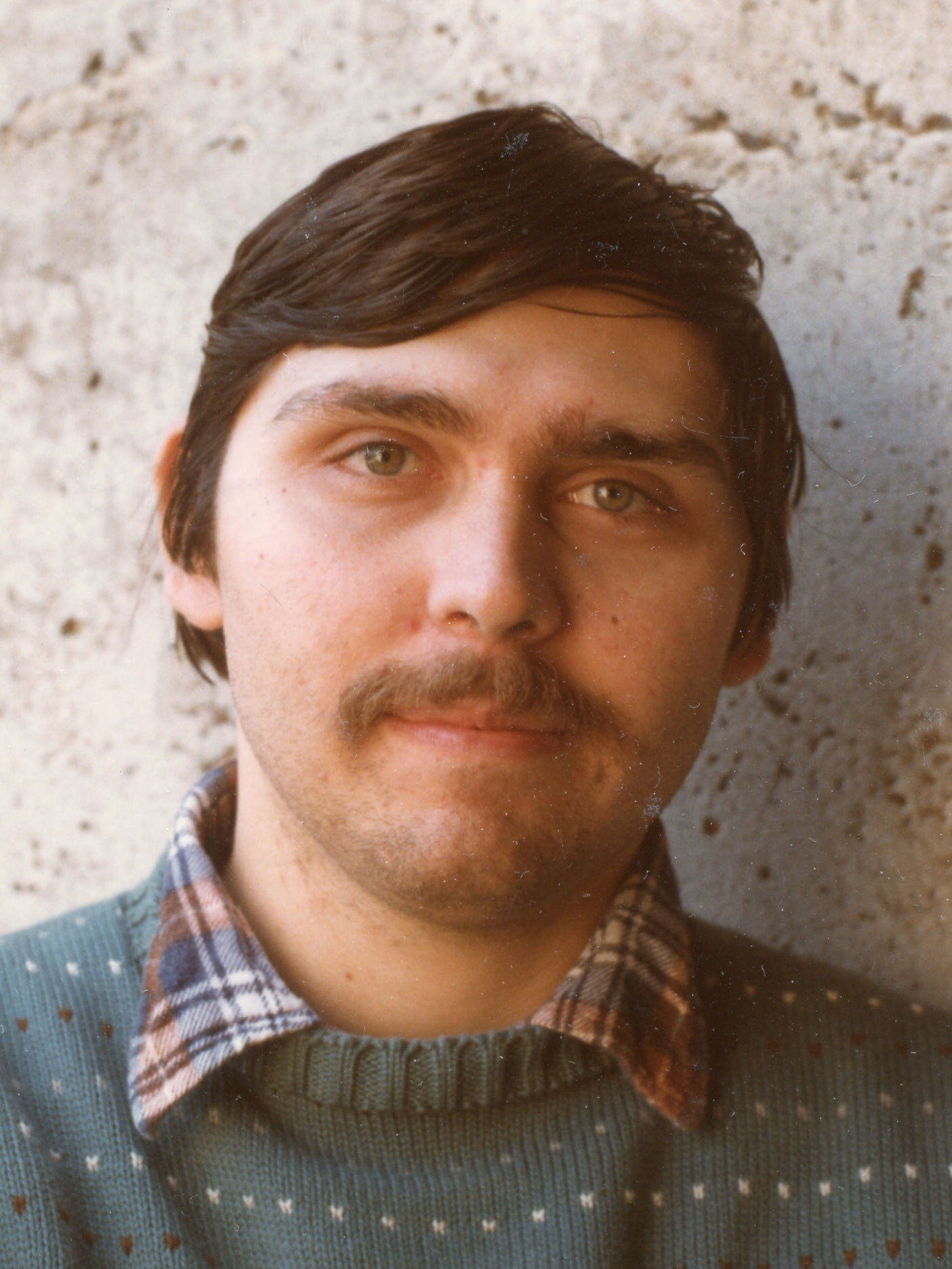
- Bestvina in 1985
- Born: 1959 (age 66–67)
- Education: University of Tennessee at Knoxville
- Awards: Simons Fellow (2025); AMS Fellow (2012)
- Scientific career
- Fields: Mathematics
- Workplaces: University of Utah; University of California at Los Angeles; Institute for Advanced Study
- Thesis: Characterizing K-Dimensional Universal Menger Compacta (1984)
- Doctoral advisor: John Joseph Walsh

Mladen Bestvina (born 1959) is a Croatian-American mathematician working in the area of geometric group theory. He is a Distinguished Professor in the Department of Mathematics at the University of Utah.

== Life and career ==
Mladen Bestvina is a three-time medalist at the International Mathematical Olympiad (two silver medals in 1976 and 1978 and a bronze medal in 1977). He received a B. Sc. in 1982 from the University of Zagreb. He obtained a PhD in Mathematics in 1984 at the University of Tennessee under the direction of John Walsh. He was a visiting scholar at the Institute for Advanced Study in 1987-88 and again in 1990–91. Bestvina had been a faculty member at UCLA, and joined the faculty in the Department of Mathematics at the University of Utah in 1993. He was appointed a Distinguished Professor at the University of Utah in 2008. Bestvina received the Alfred P. Sloan Fellowship in 1988–89 and a Presidential Young Investigator Award in 1988–91.

Bestvina gave an invited address at the International Congress of Mathematicians in Beijing in 2002,, was topology section member in Madrid in 2006 and gave a plenary lecture at virtual ICM 2022. He also gave a Unni Namboodiri Lecture in Geometry and Topology at the University of Chicago.

Bestvina served as an Editorial Board member for the Transactions of the American Mathematical Society and as an associate editor of the Annals of Mathematics. Currently he is an editorial board member for Duke Mathematical Journal, Geometric and Functional Analysis, Geometry and Topology, the Journal of Topology and Analysis, Groups, Geometry and Dynamics, Michigan Mathematical Journal, Rocky Mountain Journal of Mathematics, and Glasnik Matematicki.

In 2012 he became a fellow of the American Mathematical Society. Since 2012, he has been a correspondent member of the HAZU (Croatian Academy of Science and Art).

== Mathematical contributions ==
A 1988 monograph of Bestvina gave an abstract topological characterization of universal Menger compacta in all dimensions; previously only the cases of dimension 0 and 1 were well understood. John Walsh wrote in a review of Bestvina's monograph: 'This work, which formed the author's Ph.D. thesis at the University of Tennessee, represents a monumental step forward, having moved the status of the topological structure of higher-dimensional Menger compacta from one of "close to total ignorance" to one of "complete understanding".'

In a 1992 paper Bestvina and Feighn obtained a Combination Theorem for word-hyperbolic groups. The theorem provides a set of sufficient conditions for amalgamated free products and HNN extensions of word-hyperbolic groups to again be word-hyperbolic. The Bestvina–Feighn Combination Theorem became a standard tool in geometric group theory and has had many applications and generalizations (e.g.).

Bestvina and Feighn also gave the first published treatment of Rips' theory of stable group actions on R-trees (the Rips machine) In particular their paper gives a proof of the Morgan–Shalen conjecture that a finitely generated group G admits a free isometric action on an R-tree if and only if G is a free product of surface groups, free groups and free abelian groups.

A 1992 paper of Bestvina and Handel introduced the notion of a train track map for representing elements of Out(F_{n}). In the same paper they introduced the notion of a relative train track and applied train track methods to solve the Scott conjecture, which says that for every automorphism α of a finitely generated free group F_{n} the fixed subgroup of α is free of rank at most n. Since then train tracks became a standard tool in the study of algebraic, geometric and dynamical properties of automorphisms of free groups and of subgroups of Out(F_{n}). Examples of applications of train tracks include: a theorem of Brinkmann proving that for an automorphism α of F_{n} the mapping torus group of α is word-hyperbolic if and only if α has no periodic conjugacy classes; a theorem of Bridson and Groves that for every automorphism α of F_{n} the mapping torus group of α satisfies a quadratic isoperimetric inequality; a proof of algorithmic solvability of the conjugacy problem for free-by-cyclic groups; and others.

Bestvina, Feighn and Handel later proved that the group Out(F_{n}) satisfies the Tits alternative, settling a long-standing open problem.

In a 1997 paper Bestvina and Brady developed a version of discrete Morse theory for cubical complexes and applied it to study homological finiteness properties of subgroups of right-angled Artin groups. In particular, they constructed an example of a group which provides a counter-example to either the Whitehead asphericity conjecture or to the Eilenberg−Ganea conjecture, thus showing that at least one of these conjectures must be false. Brady subsequently used their Morse theory technique to construct the first example of a finitely presented subgroup of a word-hyperbolic group that is not itself word-hyperbolic.

== Selected publications ==
- Bestvina, Mladen, Characterizing k-dimensional universal Menger compacta. Memoirs of the American Mathematical Society, vol. 71 (1988), no. 380
- Bestvina, Mladen; Feighn, Mark, Bounding the complexity of simplicial group actions on trees. Inventiones Mathematicae, vol. 103 (1991), no. 3, pp. 449–469
- Bestvina, Mladen; Mess, Geoffrey, The boundary of negatively curved groups. Journal of the American Mathematical Society, vol. 4 (1991), no. 3, pp. 469–481
- Mladen Bestvina, and Michael Handel, Train tracks and automorphisms of free groups. Annals of Mathematics (2), vol. 135 (1992), no. 1, pp. 1–51
- M. Bestvina and M. Feighn, A combination theorem for negatively curved groups. Journal of Differential Geometry, Volume 35 (1992), pp. 85–101
- M. Bestvina and M. Feighn. Stable actions of groups on real trees. Inventiones Mathematicae, vol. 121 (1995), no. 2, pp. 287 321
- Bestvina, Mladen and Brady, Noel, Morse theory and finiteness properties of groups. Inventiones Mathematicae, vol. 129 (1997), no. 3, pp. 445–470
- Mladen Bestvina, Mark Feighn, and Michael Handel. The Tits alternative for Out(F_{n}). I. Dynamics of exponentially-growing automorphisms. Annals of Mathematics (2), vol. 151 (2000), no. 2, pp. 517–623
- Mladen Bestvina, Mark Feighn, and Michael Handel. The Tits alternative for Out(F_{n}). II. A Kolchin type theorem. Annals of Mathematics (2), vol. 161 (2005), no. 1, pp. 1–59
- Bestvina, Mladen; Bux, Kai-Uwe; Margalit, Dan, The dimension of the Torelli group. Journal of the American Mathematical Society, vol. 23 (2010), no. 1, pp. 61–105

== See also ==
- Real tree
- Artin group
- Out(F_{n})
- Train track map
- Pseudo-Anosov map
- Word-hyperbolic group
- Mapping class group
- Whitehead conjecture
