= Induced homomorphism =

Structure preserving map derived canonically from another map

In mathematics, especially in algebraic topology, an induced homomorphism is a homomorphism derived in a canonical way from another map. For example, a continuous map from a topological space X to a topological space Y induces a group homomorphism from the fundamental group of X to the fundamental group of Y.

More generally, in category theory, any functor by definition provides an induced morphism in the target category for each morphism in the source category. For example, fundamental groups, higher homotopy groups, singular homology, and De Rham cohomology are algebraic structures that are functorial, meaning that their definition provides a functor from (e.g.) the category of topological spaces to (e.g.) the category of groups or rings. This means that each space is associated with an algebraic structure, while each continuous map between spaces is associated with a structure-preserving map between structures, called an induced homomorphism. A homomorphism induced from a map $h$ is often denoted $h_*$.

Induced homomorphisms often inherit properties of the maps they come from; for example, two maps that are inverse to each other up to homotopy induce homomorphisms that are inverse to each other. A common use of induced homomorphisms is the following: by showing that a homomorphism with certain properties cannot exist, one concludes that there cannot exist a continuous map with properties that would induce it. Thanks to this, relations between spaces and continuous maps, often very intricate, can be inferred from relations between the homomorphisms they induce. The latter may be simpler to analyze, since they involve algebraic structures which can be often easily described, compared, and calculated in.

== In fundamental groups ==
Let $X$ and $Y$ be topological spaces with points $x_0$ in $X$ and $y_0$ in $Y$. Let $h:X\to Y$ be a continuous map such that $h(x_0)=y_0$. Then we can define a map $h_*$ from the fundamental group $\pi_1(X,x_0)$ to the fundamental group $\pi_1(Y,y_0)$ as follows: any element of $\pi_1(X,x_0)$, represented by a loop $f$ in $X$ based at $x_0$, is mapped to the loop in $\pi_1(Y,y_0)$ obtained by composing with $h$:

$$h_*([f]):= [h \circ f]$$

Here $[f]$ denotes the equivalence class of $f$ under homotopy, as in the definition of the fundamental group. It is easily checked from the definitions that $h_*$ is a well-defined function π_{1}(X, x_{0}) → π_{1}(Y, y_{0}): loops in the same equivalence class, i.e. homotopic loops in X, are mapped to homotopic loops in Y, because a homotopy can be composed with h as well. It also follows from the definition of the group operation in fundamental groups (namely by concatenation of loops) that $h_*$ is a group homomorphism:

$$h_*([f + g]) = h_*([f]) + h_*([g])$$

(where + denotes concatenation of loops, with the first + in X and the second + in Y). The resulting homomorphism $h_*$ is the homomorphism induced from h.

It may also be denoted as π(h). Indeed, π gives a functor from the category of pointed spaces to the category of groups: it associates the fundamental group π_{1}(X, x_{0}) to each pointed space (X, x_{0}) and it associates the induced homomorphism $\pi(h)=h_*$ to each base-point preserving continuous map h: (X, x_{0}) → (Y, y_{0}). To prove it satisfies the definition of a functor, one has to further check that it is compatible with composition: for base-point preserving continuous maps h: (X, x_{0}) → (Y, y_{0}) and k: (Y, y_{0}) → (Z, z_{0}), we have:

$$\pi(k \circ h) = \pi(k) \circ \pi(h).$$

This implies that if h is not only a continuous map but in fact a homeomorphism between X and Y, then the induced homomorphism $\pi(h)$ is an isomorphism between fundamental groups (because the homomorphism induced by the inverse of h is the inverse of $\pi(h)$, by the above equation). (See section III.5.4, p. 201, in H. Schubert.)

=== Applications ===
1. The torus is not homeomorphic to R^{2} because their fundamental groups are not isomorphic (since their fundamental groups don’t have the same cardinality). More generally, a simply connected space cannot be homeomorphic to a non-simply-connected space; one has a trivial fundamental group and the other does not.

2. The fundamental group of the circle is isomorphic to the group of integers. Therefore, the one-point compactification of R has a fundamental group isomorphic to the group of integers (since the one-point compactification of R is homeomorphic to the circle). This also shows that the one-point compactification of a simply connected space need not be simply connected.

3. The converse of the theorem need not hold. For example, R^{2} and R^{3} have isomorphic fundamental groups but are still not homeomorphic. Their fundamental groups are isomorphic because each space is simply connected. However, the two spaces cannot be homeomorphic because deleting a point from R^{2} leaves a non-simply-connected space but deleting a point from R^{3} leaves a simply connected space (If we delete a line lying in R^{3}, the space wouldn’t be simply connected any more. In fact this generalizes to R^{n} whereby deleting a (n − 2)-dimensional subspace from R^{n} leaves a non-simply-connected space).

4. If A is a strong deformation retract of a topological space X, then the inclusion map from A to X induces an isomorphism between fundamental groups (so the fundamental group of X can be described using only loops in the subspace A).

== Other examples ==
Likewise there are induced homomorphisms of higher homotopy groups and homology groups. Any homology theory comes with induced homomorphisms. For instance, simplicial homology, singular homology, and Borel–Moore homology all have induced homomorphisms (IV.1.3, pp. 240–241) Similarly, any cohomology comes induced homomorphisms, though in the opposite direction (from a group associated with Y to a group associated with X). For instance, Čech cohomology, de Rham cohomology, and singular cohomology all have induced homomorphisms (IV.4.2–3, pp. 298–299). Generalizations such as cobordism also have induced homomorphisms.

== General definition ==
Given some category $\mathbf{T}$ of topological spaces (possibly with some additional structure) such as the category of all topological spaces Top or the category of pointed topological spaces (that is, topological spaces with a distinguished base point), and a functor $F: \mathbf{T} \to \mathbf{A}$ from that category into some category $\mathbf{A}$ of algebraic structures such as the category of groups Grp or of abelian groups Ab which then associates such an algebraic structure to every topological space, then for every morphism $f: X \to Y$ of $\mathbf{T}$ (which is usually a continuous map, possibly preserving some other structure such as the base point) this functor induces an induced morphism $F(f): F(X) \to F(Y)$ in $\mathbf{A}$ (which for example is a group homomorphism if $\mathbf{A}$ is a category of groups) between the algebraic structures $F(X)$ and $F(Y)$ associated to $X$ and $Y$, respectively.

If $F$ is not a (covariant) functor but a contravariant functor then by definition it induces morphisms in the opposite direction: $F(f): F(Y) \to F(X)$. Cohomology groups give an example.
