= Mapping torus =

In mathematics, specifically in topology, the mapping torus of a homeomorphism f of some topological space X to itself is a particular geometric construction with f. Take the cartesian product of X with a closed interval I, and glue the boundary components together by the static homeomorphism:

$$M_f =\frac{(I \times X)}{(1,x)\sim (0,f(x))}$$

The result is a fiber bundle whose base is a circle and whose fiber is the original space X.

If X is a manifold, M_{f} will be a manifold of dimension one higher, and it is said to "fiber over the circle".

As a simple example, let $X$ be the circle, and $f$ be the inversion $e^{ix} \mapsto e^{-ix}$, then the mapping torus is the Klein bottle.

Mapping tori of surface homeomorphisms play a key role in the theory of 3-manifolds and have been intensely studied. If S is a closed surface of genus g ≥ 2 and if f is a self-homeomorphism of S, the mapping torus M_{f} is a closed 3-manifold that fibers over the circle with fiber S. A deep result of Thurston states that in this case the 3-manifold M_{f} is hyperbolic if and only if f is a pseudo-Anosov homeomorphism of S.
