= Outer space (mathematics) =

In the mathematical subject of geometric group theory, the Culler–Vogtmann Outer space or just Outer space of a free group F_{n} is a topological space consisting of the so-called "marked metric graph structures" of volume 1 on F_{n}. The Outer space, denoted X_{n} or CV_{n}, comes equipped with a natural action of the group of outer automorphisms Out(F_{n}) of F_{n}. The Outer space was introduced in a 1986 paper of Marc Culler and Karen Vogtmann, and it serves as a free group analog of the Teichmüller space of a hyperbolic surface. Outer space is used to study homology and cohomology groups of Out(F_{n}) and to obtain information about algebraic, geometric and dynamical properties of Out(F_{n}), of its subgroups and individual outer automorphisms of F_{n}. The space X_{n} can also be thought of as the set of F_{n}-equivariant isometry types of minimal free discrete isometric actions of F_{n} on R-trees T such that the quotient metric graph T/F_{n} has volume 1.

== History ==
The Outer space $X_n$ was introduced in a 1986 paper of Marc Culler and Karen Vogtmann, inspired by analogy with the Teichmüller space of a hyperbolic surface. They showed that the natural action of $\operatorname{Out}(F_n)$ on $X_n$ is properly discontinuous, and that $X_n$ is contractible.

In the same paper Culler and Vogtmann constructed an embedding, via the translation length functions discussed below, of $X_n$ into the infinite-dimensional projective space $\mathbb{P}^{\,\mathcal{C}} = \mathbb{R}^{\mathcal{C}} \!-\! \{0\}/\mathbb{R}_{>0}$, where $\mathcal{C}$ is the set of nontrivial conjugacy classes of elements of $F_n$. They also proved that the closure $\overline X_n$ of $X_n$ in $\mathbb{P}^{\,\mathcal{C}}$ is compact.

Later a combination of the results of Cohen and Lustig and of Bestvina and Feighn identified (see Section 1.3 of) the space $\overline X_n$ with the space $\overline{CV}_n$ of projective classes of "very small" minimal isometric actions of $F_n$ on $\mathbb R$-trees.

== Formal definition ==
=== Marked metric graphs ===
Let n ≥ 2. For the free group F_{n} fix a "rose" R_{n}, that is a wedge, of n circles wedged at a vertex v, and fix an isomorphism between F_{n} and the fundamental group π_{1}(R_{n}, v) of R_{n}. From this point on we identify F_{n} and π_{1}(R_{n}, v) via this isomorphism.

A marking on F_{n} consists of a homotopy equivalence f : R_{n} → Γ where Γ is a finite connected graph without degree-one and degree-two vertices. Up to a (free) homotopy, f is uniquely determined by the isomorphism f_{#} : π_{1}(R_{n}) → π_{1}(Γ), that is by an isomorphism F_{n} → π_{1}(Γ).

A metric graph is a finite connected graph $\gamma$ together with the assignment to every topological edge e of Γ of a positive real number L(e) called the length of e. The volume of a metric graph is the sum of the lengths of its topological edges.

A marked metric graph structure on F_{n} consists of a marking f : R_{n} → Γ together with a metric graph structure L on Γ.

Two marked metric graph structures f_{1} : R_{n} → Γ_{1} and f_{2} : R_{n} → Γ_{2} are equivalent if there exists an isometry θ : Γ_{1} → Γ_{2} such that, up to free homotopy, we have θ ∘ f_{1} = f_{2}.

The Outer space X_{n} consists of equivalence classes of all the volume-one marked metric graph structures on F_{n}.

=== Weak topology on the Outer space ===
==== Open simplices ====
Let f : R_{n} → Γ where Γ is a marking and let k be the number of topological edges in Γ. We order the edges of Γ as e_{1}, ..., e_{k}. Let

$$\Delta_k = \left\{ (x_1, \dots, x_k)\in \mathbb{R}^k \,\Big|\, \sum_{i=1}^k x_i =1, x_i >0 \text{ for } i=1,\dots, k\right\}$$

be the standard (k − 1)-dimensional open simplex in R^{k}.

Given f, there is a natural map j : Δ_{k} → X_{n}, where for x = (x_{1}, ..., x_{k}) ∈ Δ_{k}, the point j(x) of X_{n} is given by the marking f together with the metric graph structure L on Γ such that L(e_{i}) = x_{i} for i = 1, ..., k.

One can show that j is in fact an injective map, that is, distinct points of Δ_{k} correspond to non-equivalent marked metric graph structures on F_{n}.

The set j(Δ_{k}) is called open simplex in X_{n} corresponding to f and is denoted S(f). By construction, X_{n} is the union of open simplices corresponding to all markings on F_{n}. Note that two open simplices in X_{n} either are disjoint or coincide.

==== Closed simplices ====
Let f : R_{n} → Γ where Γ is a marking and let k be the number of topological edges in Γ. As before, we order the edges of Γ as e_{1}, ..., e_{k}. Define Δ_{k}′ ⊆ R^{k} as the set of all x = (x_{1}, ..., x_{k}) ∈ R^{k}, such that $\textstyle{\sum_{i=1}^k x_i=1}$, such that each x_{i} ≥ 0 and such that the set of all edges e_{i} in $\Gamma$ with x_{i} = 0 is a subforest in Γ.

The map j : Δ_{k} → X_{n} extends to a map h : Δ_{k}′ → X_{n} as follows. For x in Δ_{k} put h(x) = j(x). For x ∈ Δ_{k}′ − Δ_{k} the point h(x) of X_{n} is obtained by taking the marking f, contracting all edges e_{i} of $\Gamma$ with x_{i} = 0 to obtain a new marking f_{1} : R_{n} → Γ_{1} and then assigning to each surviving edge e_{i} of Γ_{1} length x_{i} > 0.

It can be shown that for every marking f the map h : Δ_{k}′ → X_{n} is still injective. The image of h is called the closed simplex in X_{n} corresponding to f and is denoted by S′(f). Every point in X_{n} belongs to only finitely many closed simplices and a point of X_{n} represented by a marking f : R_{n} → Γ where the graph Γ is tri-valent belongs to a unique closed simplex in X_{n}, namely S′(f).

The weak topology on the Outer space X_{n} is defined by saying that a subset C of X_{n} is closed if and only if for every marking f : R_{n} → Γ the set h^{−1}(C) is closed in Δ_{k}′. In particular, the map h : Δ_{k}′ → X_{n} is a topological embedding.

=== Points of Outer space as actions on trees ===
Let x be a point in X_{n} given by a marking f : R_{n} → Γ with a volume-one metric graph structure L on Γ. Let T be the universal cover of Γ. Thus T is a simply connected graph, that is T is a topological tree. We can also lift the metric structure L to T by giving every edge of T the same length as the length of its image in Γ. This turns T into a metric space (T, d) which is a real tree. The fundamental group π_{1}(Γ) acts on T by covering transformations which are also isometries of (T, d), with the quotient space T/π_{1}(Γ) = Γ. Since the induced homomorphism f_{#} is an isomorphism between F_{n} = π_{1}(R_{n}) and π_{1}(Γ), we also obtain an isometric action of F_{n} on T with T/F_{n} = Γ. This action is free and discrete. Since Γ is a finite connected graph with no degree-one vertices, this action is also minimal, meaning that T has no proper F_{n}-invariant subtrees.

Moreover, every minimal free and discrete isometric action of F_{n} on a real tree with the quotient being a metric graph of volume one arises in this fashion from some point x of X_{n}. This defines a bijective correspondence between X_{n} and the set of equivalence classes of minimal free and discrete isometric actions of F_{n} on a real trees with volume-one quotients. Here two such actions of F_{n} on real trees T_{1} and T_{2} are equivalent if there exists an F_{n}-equivariant isometry between T_{1} and T_{2}.

==== Length functions ====
Give an action of F_{n} on a real tree T as above, one can define the translation length function associate with this action:

$$\ell_T: F_n \to \mathbb R, \quad \ell_T(g)=\min_{t\in T} d(t,gt), \quad\text{ for } g\in F_n.$$

For g ≠ 1 there is a (unique) isometrically embedded copy of R in T, called the axis of g, such that g acts on this axis by a translation of magnitude $\ell_T(g)>0$. For this reason $\ell_T(g)$ is called the translation length of g. For any g, u in F_{n} we have $\ell_T(ugu^{-1}) = \ell_T(g)$, that is the function $\ell_T$ is constant on each conjugacy class in G.

In the marked metric graph model of Outer space translation length functions can be interpreted as follows. Let T in X_{n} be represented by a marking f : R_{n} → Γ with a volume-one metric graph structure L on Γ. Let g ∈ F_{n} = π_{1}(R_{n}). First push g forward via f_{#} to get a closed loop in Γ and then tighten this loop to an immersed circuit in Γ. The L-length of this circuit is the translation length $\ell_T(g)$ of g.

A basic general fact from the theory of group actions on real trees says that a point of the Outer space is uniquely determined by its translation length function. Namely if two trees with minimal free isometric actions of F_{n} define equal translation length functions on F_{n} then the two trees are F_{n}-equivariantly isometric. Hence the map $T\mapsto \ell_T$ from X_{n} to the set of R-valued functions on F_{n} is injective.

One defines the length function topology or axes topology on X_{n} as follows. For every T in X_{n}, every finite subset K of F_{n} and every ε > 0 let

$$V_T(K,\epsilon)= \{ T'\in X_n: |\ell_T(g)-\ell_{T'}(g)| < \epsilon \text{ for every } g\in K\}.$$

In the length function topology for every T in X_{n} a basis of neighborhoods of T in X_{n} is given by the family V_{T}(K, ε) where K is a finite subset of F_{n} and where ε > 0.

Convergence of sequences in the length function topology can be characterized as follows. For T in X_{n} and a sequence T_{i} in X_{n} we have $\lim_{i\to\infty} T_i = T$ if and only if for every g in F_{n} we have $\lim_{i\to\infty} \ell_{T_i}(g) = \ell_T(g).$

=== Gromov topology ===
Another topology on $X_n$ is the so-called Gromov topology or the equivariant Gromov–Hausdorff convergence topology, which provides a version of Gromov–Hausdorff convergence adapted to the setting of an isometric group action.

When defining the Gromov topology, one should think of points of $X_n$ as actions of $F_n$ on $\mathbb R$-trees. Informally, given a tree $T\in X_n$, another tree $T'\in X_n$ is "close" to $T$ in the Gromov topology, if for some large finite subtrees of $Y\subseteq T, Y'\subseteq T'\in X_n$ and a large finite subset $B\subseteq F_n$ there exists an "almost isometry" between $Y'$ and $Y$ with respect to which the (partial) actions of $B$ on $Y'$ and $Y$ almost agree. For the formal definition of the Gromov topology see.

==== Coincidence of the weak, the length function and Gromov topologies ====
An important basic result states that the Gromov topology, the weak topology and the length function topology on X_{n} coincide.

== Action of Out(F_{n}) on Outer space ==
The group Out(F_{n}) admits a natural right action by homeomorphisms on X_{n}.

First we define the action of the automorphism group Aut(F_{n}) on X_{n}. Let α ∈ Aut(F_{n}) be an automorphism of F_{n}. Let x be a point of X_{n} given by a marking f : R_{n} → Γ with a volume-one metric graph structure L on Γ. Let τ : R_{n} → R_{n} be a homotopy equivalence whose induced homomorphism at the fundamental group level is the automorphism α of F_{n} = π_{1}(R_{n}). The element xα of X_{n} is given by the marking f ∘ τ : R_{n} → Γ with the metric structure L on Γ. That is, to get xα from x we simply precompose the marking defining x with τ.

In the real tree model this action can be described as follows. Let T in X_{n} be a real tree with a minimal free and discrete co-volume-one isometric action of F_{n}. Let α ∈ Aut(F_{n}). As a metric space, Tα is equal to T. The action of F_{n} is twisted by α. Namely, for any t in T and g in F_{n} we have:

$$g\underset{T\alpha}{\cdot} t= \alpha(g) \underset{T}{\cdot} t.$$

At the level of translation length functions the tree Tα is given as:

$$\ell_{T\alpha}(g)=\ell_T(\alpha(g)) \quad \text{ for } g\in F_n.$$

One then checks that for the above action of Aut(F_{n}) on Outer space X_{n} the subgroup of inner automorphisms Inn(F_{n}) is contained in the kernel of this action, that is every inner automorphism acts trivially on X_{n}. It follows that the action of Aut(F_{n}) on X_{n} quotients through to an action of Out(F_{n}) = Aut(F_{n})/Inn(F_{n}) on X_{n}. namely, if φ ∈ Out(F_{n}) is an outer automorphism of F_{n} and if α in Aut(F_{n}) is an actual automorphism representing φ then for any x in X_{n} we have xφ = xα.

The right action of Out(F_{n}) on X_{n} can be turned into a left action via a standard conversion procedure. Namely, for φ ∈ Out(F_{n}) and x in X_{n} set

φx = xφ^{−1}.

This left action of Out(F_{n}) on X_{n} is also sometimes considered in the literature although most sources work with the right action.

=== Moduli space ===
The quotient space M_{n} = X_{n}/Out(F_{n}) is the moduli space which consists of isometry types of finite connected graphs Γ without degree-one and degree-two vertices, with fundamental groups isomorphic to F_{n} (that is, with the first Betti number equal to n) equipped with volume-one metric structures. The quotient topology on M_{n} is the same as that given by the Gromov–Hausdorff distance between metric graphs representing points of M_{n}. The moduli space M_{n} is not compact and the "cusps" in M_{n} arise from decreasing towards zero lengths of edges for homotopically nontrivial subgraphs (e.g. an essential circuit) of a metric graph Γ.

== Basic properties and facts about Outer space ==
- Outer space X_{n} is contractible and the action of Out(F_{n}) on X_{n} is properly discontinuous, as was proved by Culler and Vogtmann in their original 1986 paper where Outer space was introduced.
- The space X_{n} has topological dimension 3n − 4. The reason is that if Γ is a finite connected graph without degree-one and degree-two vertices with fundamental group isomorphic to F_{n}, then Γ has at most 3n − 3 edges and it has exactly 3n − 3 edges when Γ is trivalent. Hence the top-dimensional open simplex in X_{n} has dimension 3n − 4.
- Outer space X_{n} contains a specific deformation retract K_{n} of X_{n}, called the spine of Outer space. The spine K_{n} has dimension 2n − 3, is Out(F_{n})-invariant and has compact quotient under the action of Out(F_{n}).

== Unprojectivized Outer space ==
The unprojectivized Outer space $cv_n$ consists of equivalence classes of all marked metric graph structures on F_{n} where the volume of the metric graph in the marking is allowed to be any positive real number. The space $cv_n$ can also be thought of as the set of all free minimal discrete isometric actions of F_{n} on R-trees, considered up to F_{n}-equivariant isometry. The unprojectivized Outer space inherits the same structures that $X_n$ has, including the coincidence of the three topologies (Gromov, axes, weak), and an $\operatorname{Out}(F_n)$-action. In addition, there is a natural action of $\mathbb R_{>0}$ on $cv_n$ by scalar multiplication.

Topologically, $cv_n$ is homeomorphic to $X_n\times (0,\infty)$. In particular, $cv_n$ is also contractible.

== Projectivized Outer space ==
The projectivized Outer space is the quotient space $CV_n:=cv_n/\mathbb R_{>0}$ under the action of $\mathbb R_{>0}$ on $cv_n$ by scalar multiplication. The space $CV_n$ is equipped with the quotient topology. For a tree $T\in cv_n$ its projective equivalence class is denoted $[T]=\{cT \mid c>0\}\subseteq cv_n$. The action of $\operatorname{Out}(F_n)$ on $cv_n$ naturally quotients through to the action of $\operatorname{Out}(F_n)$ on $CV_n$. Namely, for $\phi\in \operatorname{Out}(F_n)$ and $T\in cv_n$ put $[T]\phi:= [T\phi]$.

A key observation is that the map $X_n \to CV_n, T\mapsto [T]$ is an $\operatorname{Out}(F_n)$-equivariant homeomorphism. For this reason the spaces $X_n$ and $CV_n$ are often identified.

== Lipschitz distance ==
The Lipschitz distance, named for Rudolf Lipschitz, for Outer space corresponds to the Thurston metric in Teichmüller space. For two points $x, y$ in X_{n} the (right) Lipschitz distance $d_R$ is defined as the (natural) logarithm of the maximally stretched closed path from $x$ to $y$:

$\Lambda_R(x,y):=\sup_{\gamma \in F_n\setminus \{1\}} \frac{\ell_y(\gamma)}{\ell_x(\gamma)}$ and $d_R(x,y):= \log \Lambda_R(x,y)$

This is an asymmetric metric (also sometimes called a quasimetric), i.e. it only fails symmetry $d_R(x,y)=d_R(y,x)$. The symmetric Lipschitz metric normally denotes:

$$d(x,y):=d_R(x,y)+d_R(y,x)$$

The supremum $\Lambda_R(x,y)$ is always obtained and can be calculated by a finite set the so called candidates of $x$.

$$\Lambda_R(x,y) = \max_{\gamma \in \operatorname{cand}(x)} \frac{\ell_y(\gamma)}{\ell_x(\gamma)}$$

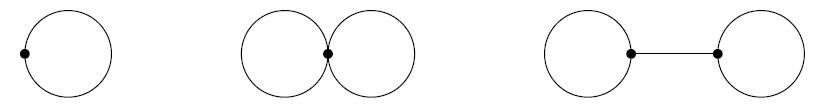
A simple loop, a figure of eight, and a barbell

Where $\operatorname{cand}(x)$ is the finite set of conjugacy classes in F_{n} which correspond to embeddings of a simple loop, a figure of eight, or a barbell into $x$ via the marking (see the diagram).

The stretching factor also equals the minimal Lipschitz constant of a homotopy equivalence carrying over the marking, i.e.

$$\Lambda_R(x,y)=\min_{h \in H(x,y)} Lip(h)$$

Where $H(x,y)$ are the continuous functions $h: x \to y$ such that for the marking $f_x$ on $x$ the marking $h \circ f_x$ is freely homotopic to the marking $f_y$ on $y$.

The induced topology is the same as the weak topology and the isometry group is $\operatorname{Out}(F_n)$ for both, the symmetric and asymmetric Lipschitz distance.

== Applications and generalizations ==
- The closure $\overline{cv}_n$ of $cv_n$ in the length function topology is known to consist of (F_{n}-equivariant isometry classes of) all very small minimal isometric actions of F_{n} on R-trees. Here the closure is taken in the space of all minimal isometric "irreducible" actions of $F_n$ on $\mathbb R$-trees, considered up to equivariant isometry. It is known that the Gromov topology and the axes topology on the space of irreducible actions coincide, so the closure can be understood in either sense. The projectivization of $\overline{cv}_n$ with respect to multiplication by positive scalars gives the space $\overline{CV}_n$ which is the length function compactification of $CV_n$ and of $X_n$, analogous to Thurston's compactification of the Teichmüller space.
- Analogs and generalizations of the Outer space have been developed for free products, for right-angled Artin groups, for the so-called deformation spaces of group actions and in some other contexts.
- A base-pointed version of Outer space, called Auter space, for marked metric graphs with base-points, was constructed by Hatcher and Vogtmann in 1998. The Auter space $A_n$ shares many properties in common with the Outer space, but $A_n$ only comes with an action of $\operatorname{Aut}(F_n)$.

== See also ==
- Mapping class group
- Train track map
- Out(Fn)
