= Outer automorphism group =

Mathematical group

In mathematics, the outer automorphism group of a group, G, is the quotient, Aut(G) / Inn(G), where Aut(G) is the automorphism group of G and Inn(G) is the subgroup consisting of inner automorphisms. The outer automorphism group is usually denoted Out(G). If Out(G) is trivial and G has a trivial center, then G is said to be complete.

An automorphism of a group that is not inner is called an outer automorphism. The cosets of Inn(G) with respect to outer automorphisms are then the elements of Out(G); this is an instance of the fact that quotients of groups are not, in general, (isomorphic to) subgroups. If the inner automorphism group is trivial (when a group is abelian), the automorphism group and outer automorphism group are naturally identified; that is, the outer automorphism group does act on the group.

For example, for the alternating group, A_{n}, the outer automorphism group is usually the group of order 2, with exceptions noted below. Considering A_{n} as a subgroup of the symmetric group, S_{n}, conjugation by any odd permutation is an outer automorphism of A_{n} or more precisely "represents the class of the (non-trivial) outer automorphism of A_{n}", but the outer automorphism does not correspond to conjugation by any particular odd element, and all conjugations by odd elements are equivalent up to conjugation by an even element.

== Structure ==
The Schreier conjecture, proposed by Otto Schreier in 1926, asserts that Out(G) is always a solvable group when G is a finite simple group. This result is now known to be true as a corollary of the classification of finite simple groups, although no simpler proof is known.

== As dual of the center ==
The outer automorphism group is dual to the center in the following sense: conjugation by an element of G is an automorphism, yielding a map σ : G → Aut(G). The kernel of the conjugation map is the center, while the cokernel is the outer automorphism group (and the image is the inner automorphism group). This can be summarized by the exact sequence

$$Z(G) \hookrightarrow G \, \overset{\sigma}{\longrightarrow} \, \mathrm{Aut}(G) \twoheadrightarrow \mathrm{Out}(G)$$

== Applications ==
The outer automorphism group of a group acts on conjugacy classes, and accordingly on the character table. See details at character table: outer automorphisms.

=== Topology of surfaces ===
The outer automorphism group is important in the topology of surfaces because there is a connection provided by the Dehn–Nielsen theorem: the extended mapping class group of the surface is the outer automorphism group of its fundamental group.

== In finite groups ==
For the outer automorphism groups of all finite simple groups see the list of finite simple groups. Sporadic simple groups and alternating groups (other than the alternating group, A_{6}; see below) all have outer automorphism groups of order 1 or 2. The outer automorphism group of a finite simple group of Lie type is an extension of a group of "diagonal automorphisms" (cyclic except for D_{n}(q), when it has order 4), a group of "field automorphisms" (always cyclic), and a group of "graph automorphisms" (of order 1 or 2 except for D_{4}(q), when it is the symmetric group on 3 points). These extensions are not always semidirect products, as the case of the alternating group A_{6} shows; a precise criterion for this to happen was given in 2003.

Group	Parameter	Out(G)	|Out(G)|
Z		C_{2}	2: the identity and the outer automorphism x ↦ −x
C_{n}	n > 2	(ℤ/nℤ)^{×}	φ(n) = $n\prod_{p|n}\left(1 - \frac{1}{p}\right)$; one corresponding to multiplication by an invertible element in the ring ℤ/nℤ.
Z_{p}^{n}	p prime, n > 1	GL_{n}(p)	(p^{n} − 1)(p^{n} − p )(p^{n} − p^{2})...(p^{n} − p^{n−1})
S_{n}	n ≠ 6	C_{1}	1
S_{6}		C_{2} (see below)	2
A_{n}	n ≠ 6	C_{2}	2
A_{6}		C_{2} × C_{2} (see below)	4
PSL_{2}(p)	p > 3 prime	C_{2}	2
PSL_{2}(2^{n})	n > 1	C_{n}	n
PSL_{3}(4) = M_{21}		Dih_{6}	12
M_{n}	n ∈ {11, 23, 24}	C_{1}	1
M_{n}	n ∈ {12, 22}	C_{2}	2
Co_{n}	n ∈ {1, 2, 3}	C_{1}	1

== In symmetric and alternating groups ==
The outer automorphism group of a finite simple group in some infinite family of finite simple groups can almost always be given by a uniform formula that works for all elements of the family. There is just one exception to this: the alternating group A_{6} has outer automorphism group of order 4, rather than 2 as do the other simple alternating groups (given by conjugation by an odd permutation). Equivalently the symmetric group S_{6} is the only symmetric group with a non-trivial outer automorphism group.

$$\begin{align}
n \neq 6: \operatorname{Out}(\mathrm{S}_n) & = \mathrm{C}_1 \\
n \geq 3,\ n \neq 6: \operatorname{Out}(\mathrm{A}_n) & = \mathrm{C}_2 \\
\operatorname{Out}(\mathrm{S}_6) & = \mathrm{C}_2 \\
\operatorname{Out}(\mathrm{A}_6) & = \mathrm{C}_2 \times \mathrm{C}_2
\end{align}$$

Note that, in the case of G = A_{6} = PSL(2, 9), the sequence 1 ⟶ G ⟶ Aut(G) ⟶ Out(G) ⟶ 1 does not split. A similar result holds for any PSL(2, q^{2}), q odd.

== In reductive algebraic groups ==
The symmetries of the Dynkin diagram, D_{4}, correspond to the outer automorphisms of Spin(8) in triality.

Let G now be a connected reductive group over an algebraically closed field. Then any two Borel subgroups are conjugate by an inner automorphism, so to study outer automorphisms it suffices to consider automorphisms that fix a given Borel subgroup. Associated to the Borel subgroup is a set of simple roots, and the outer automorphism may permute them, while preserving the structure of the associated Dynkin diagram. In this way one may identify the automorphism group of the Dynkin diagram of G with a subgroup of Out(G).

D_{4} has a very symmetric Dynkin diagram, which yields a large outer automorphism group of Spin(8), namely Out(Spin(8)) = S_{3}; this is called triality.

== In complex and real simple Lie algebras ==
The preceding interpretation of outer automorphisms as symmetries of a Dynkin diagram follows from the general fact, that for a complex or real simple Lie algebra, 𝔤, the automorphism group Aut(𝔤) is a semidirect product of Inn(𝔤) and Out(𝔤); i.e., the short exact sequence

1 ⟶ Inn(𝔤) ⟶ Aut(𝔤) ⟶ Out(𝔤) ⟶ 1

splits. In the complex simple case, this is a classical result, whereas for real simple Lie algebras, this fact was proven as recently as 2010.

== Word play ==
The term outer automorphism lends itself to word play: the term outermorphism is sometimes used for outer automorphism, and a particular geometry on which Out(F_{n}) acts is called outer space.

== See also ==
- Mapping class group
- Out(F_{n})
- Outer space
