= Pseudo-Anosov map =

Type of diffeomorphism or homeomorphism of a surface

In mathematics, specifically in topology, a pseudo-Anosov map is a type of a diffeomorphism or homeomorphism of a surface. It is a generalization of a linear Anosov diffeomorphism of the torus. Its definition relies on the notion of a measured foliation introduced by William Thurston, who also coined the term "pseudo-Anosov diffeomorphism" when he proved his classification of diffeomorphisms of a surface.

== Definition of a measured foliation ==
A measured foliation F on a closed surface S is a geometric structure on S which consists of a singular foliation and a measure in the transverse direction. In some neighborhood of a regular point of F, there is a "flow box" φ: U → R^{2} which sends the leaves of F to the horizontal lines in R^{2}. If two such neighborhoods U_{i} and U_{j} overlap then there is a transition function φ_{ij} defined on φ_{j}(U_{j}), with the standard property

$$\varphi_{ij}\circ\varphi_j=\varphi_i,$$

which must have the form

$$\varphi(x,y)=(f(x,y),c\pm y)$$

for some constant c. This assures that along a simple curve, the variation in y-coordinate, measured locally in every chart, is a geometric quantity (i.e. independent of the chart) and permits the definition of a total variation along a simple closed curve on S. A finite number of singularities of F of the type of "p-pronged saddle", p≥3, are allowed. At such a singular point, the differentiable structure of the surface is modified to make the point into a conical point with the total angle πp. The notion of a diffeomorphism of S is redefined with respect to this modified differentiable structure. With some technical modifications, these definitions extend to the case of a surface with boundary.

== Definition of a pseudo-Anosov map ==
A homeomorphism

$$f: S \to S$$

of a closed surface S is called pseudo-Anosov if there exists a transverse pair of measured foliations on S, F^{s} (stable) and F^{u} (unstable), and a real number λ > 1 such that the foliations are preserved by f and their transverse measures are multiplied by 1/λ and λ. The number λ is called the stretch factor or dilatation of f.

== Significance ==
Thurston constructed a compactification of the Teichmüller space T(S) of a surface S such that the action induced on T(S) by any diffeomorphism f of S extends to a homeomorphism of the Thurston compactification. The dynamics of this homeomorphism is the simplest when f is a pseudo-Anosov map: in this case, there are two fixed points on the Thurston boundary, one attracting and one repelling, and the homeomorphism behaves similarly to a hyperbolic automorphism of the Poincaré half-plane. A "generic" diffeomorphism of a surface of genus at least two is isotopic to a pseudo-Anosov diffeomorphism.

== Generalization ==
Using the theory of train tracks, the notion of a pseudo-Anosov map has been extended to self-maps of graphs (on the topological side) and outer automorphisms of free groups (on the algebraic side). This leads to an analogue of Thurston classification for the case of automorphisms of free groups, developed by Bestvina and Handel.
