= Out(Fn) =

Outer automorphism group of a free group on n generators

In mathematics, Out(F_{n}) is the outer automorphism group of a free group on n generators. These groups are ubiquitous in geometric group theory, as they act on the set of presentations with $n$ generators of any finitely generated group. Despite geometric analogies with general linear groups and mapping class groups, their complexity is generally regarded as more challenging, which has fueled the development of new techniques in the field.

== Definition ==
Let $F_n$ be the free nonabelian group of rank $n \ge 1$. The set of inner automorphisms of $F_n$, i.e. automorphisms obtained as conjugations by an element of $F_n$, is a normal subgroup $\mathrm{Inn}(F_n) \triangleleft \mathrm{Aut}(F_n)$. The outer automorphism group of $F_n$ is the quotient
$$\mathrm{Out}(F_n) := \mathrm{Aut}(F_n)/\mathrm{Inn}(F_n).$$
An element of $\mathrm{Out}(F_n)$ is called an outer class.

== Relations to other groups ==
=== Linear groups ===
The abelianization map $F_n \to \Z^n$ induces a homomorphism from $\mathrm{Out}(F_n)$ to the general linear group $\mathrm{GL}(n,\Z)$, the latter being the automorphism group of $\Z^n$. This map is onto, making $\mathrm{Out}(F_n)$ a group extension,

$$1\to \mathrm{Tor}(F_n) \to \mathrm{Out}(F_n) \to \mathrm{GL}(n,\Z)\to 1$$.

The kernel $\mathrm{Tor}(F_n)$ is the Torelli group of $F_n$.

The map $\mathrm{Out}(F_2) \to \mathrm{GL}(2,\Z)$ is an isomorphism. This no longer holds for higher ranks: the Torelli group of $F_3$ contains the automorphism fixing two basis elements and multiplying the remaining one by the commutator of the two others.

=== Aut(F_{n}) ===
By definition, $\mathrm{Aut}(F_n)$ is an extension of the inner automorphism group $\mathrm{Inn}(F_n)$ by $\mathrm{Out}(F_n)$. The inner automorphism group itself is the image of the action by conjugation, which has kernel the center $Z(F_n)$. Since $Z(F_n)$ is trivial for $n\ge 2$, this gives a short exact sequence
$$1 \rightarrow F_n \rightarrow \mathrm{Aut}(F_n) \rightarrow \mathrm{Out}(F_n) \rightarrow 1.$$
For all $n \ge 2$, there are embeddings $\mathrm{Aut}(F_n) \longrightarrow \mathrm{Out}(F_{n+1})$ obtained by taking the outer class of the extension of an automorphism of $F_n$ fixing the additional generator. Therefore, when studying properties that are inherited by subgroups and quotients, the theories of $\mathrm{Aut}(F_n)$ and $\mathrm{Out}(F_n)$ are essentially the same.

=== Mapping class groups of surfaces ===
Because $F_n$ is the fundamental group of a bouquet of n circles, $\mathrm{Out}(F_n)$ can be described topologically as the mapping class group of a bouquet of n circles (in the homotopy category), in analogy to the mapping class group of a closed surface which is isomorphic to the outer automorphism group of the fundamental group of that surface.

Given any finite graph with fundamental group $F_n$, the graph can be "thickened" to a surface $S$ with one boundary component that retracts onto the graph. The Birman exact sequence yields a map from the mapping class group $\mathrm{MCG}(S) \longrightarrow \mathrm{Out}(F_n)$. The elements of $\mathrm{Out}(F_n)$ that are in the image of such a map are called geometric. Such outer classes must leave invariant the cyclic word corresponding to the boundary, hence there are many non-geometric outer classes. A converse is true under some irreducibility assumptions, providing geometric realization for outer classes fixing a conjugacy class.

== Known results ==
- For $n\ge 4$, $\mathrm{Out}(F_n)$ is not linear, i.e. it has no faithful representation by matrices over a field (Formanek, Procesi, 1992);
- For $n\ge 3$, the isoperimetric function of $\mathrm{Out}(F_n)$ is exponential (Hatcher, Vogtmann, 1996);
- The Tits Alternative holds in $\mathrm{Out}(F_n)$: each subgroup is either virtually solvable or else it contains a free group of rank 2 (Bestvina, Feighn, Handel, 2000);
- For $n\ge 3$, $\mathrm{Out}(\mathrm{Out}(F_n)) = {1}$ (Bridson and Vogtmann, 2000);
- Every solvable subgroup of $\mathrm{Out}(F_n)$ has a finitely generated free abelian subgroup of finite index (Bestvina, Feighn, Handel, 2004);
- For $i>0$, all but finitely many of the $i$^{th}-degree homology morphisms induced by the sequence
  $$\ldots \rightarrow \mathrm{Out}(F_{n-1}) \rightarrow \mathrm{Out}(F_n) \rightarrow \mathrm{Out}(F_{n+1}) \rightarrow \ldots$$
  are isomorphisms (Hatcher and Vogtmann, 2004);
- For $n\ge 2$, the reduced $C^*$-algebra of $\mathrm{Out}(F_n)$ (i.e. the closure of its image under the regular representation) is simple;
- For $n\ge 4$, if $\Gamma$ is a finite index subgroup of $\mathrm{Out}(F_n)$, then any subgroup of $\mathrm{Out}(F_n)$ isomorphic to $\Gamma$ is a conjugate of $\Gamma$ (Farb and Handel, 2007);
- For $n\ge 5$, $\mathrm{Out}(F_n)$ has Kazhdan's property (T) (Kaluba, Nowak, Ozawa, 2019 for $n=5$; Kaluba, Kielak, Nowak, 2021 for $n\ge 6$);
- Actions on hyperbolic complexes satisfying acylindricity conditions were constructed, in analogy with complexes like the complex of curves for mapping class groups;
- For $n\ge 3$, $\mathrm{Out}(F_n)$ is rigid with respect to measure equivalence (Guirardel and Horbez, 2021 preprint).

== Outer space ==
Out(F_{n}) acts geometrically on a cell complex known as Culler–Vogtmann Outer space, which can be thought of as the Fricke-Teichmüller space for a bouquet of circles.

=== Definition ===
A point of the outer space is essentially an $\R$-graph X homotopy equivalent to a bouquet of n circles together with a certain choice of a free homotopy class of a homotopy equivalence from X to the bouquet of n circles. An $\R$-graph is just a weighted graph with weights in $\R$. The sum of all weights should be 1 and all weights should be positive. To avoid ambiguity (and to get a finite dimensional space) it is furthermore required that the valency of each vertex should be at least 3.

A more descriptive view avoiding the homotopy equivalence f is the following. We may fix an identification of the fundamental group of the bouquet of n circles with the free group $F_n$ in n variables. Furthermore, we may choose a maximal tree in X and choose for each remaining edge a direction. We will now assign to each remaining edge e a word in $F_n$ in the following way. Consider the closed path starting with e and then going back to the origin of e in the maximal tree. Composing this path with f we get a closed path in a bouquet of n circles and hence an element in its fundamental group $F_n$. This element is not well defined; if we change f by a free homotopy we obtain another element. It turns out, that those two elements are conjugate to each other, and hence we can choose the unique cyclically reduced element in this conjugacy class. It is possible to reconstruct the free homotopy type of f from these data. This view has the advantage, that it avoids the extra choice of f and has the disadvantage that additional ambiguity arises, because one has to choose a maximal tree and an orientation of the remaining edges.

The operation of Out(F_{n}) on the outer space is defined as follows. Every automorphism g of $F_n$ induces a self homotopy equivalence g′ of the bouquet of n circles. Composing f with g′ gives the desired action. And in the other model it is just application of g and making the resulting word cyclically reduced.

=== Connection to length functions ===
Every point in the outer space determines a unique length function $l_X \colon F_n \to \R$. A word in $F_n$ determines via the chosen homotopy equivalence a closed path in X. The length of the word is then the minimal length of a path in the free homotopy class of that closed path. Such a length function is constant on each conjugacy class. The assignment $X \mapsto l_X$ defines an embedding of the outer space to some infinite dimensional projective space.

=== Simplicial structure on the outer space ===
In the second model an open simplex is given by all those $\R$-graphs, which have combinatorically the same underlying graph and the same edges are labeled with the same words (only the length of the edges may differ). The boundary simplices of such a simplex consists of all graphs, that arise from this graph by collapsing an edge. If that edge is a loop it cannot be collapsed without changing the homotopy type of the graph. Hence there is no boundary simplex. So one can think about the outer space as a simplicial complex with some simplices removed. It is easy to verify, that the action of $\mathrm{Out}(F_n)$ is simplicial and has finite isotropy groups.

== See also ==
- Train track map
- Automorphism group of a free group
- Outer space
