= Mapping class group of a surface =

Concept in mathematics

In mathematics, and more precisely in topology, the mapping class group of a surface, sometimes called the modular group or Teichmüller modular group, is the group of homeomorphisms of the surface viewed up to continuous (in the compact-open topology) deformation. It is of fundamental importance for the study of 3-manifolds via their embedded surfaces and is also studied in algebraic geometry in relation to moduli problems for curves.

The mapping class group can be defined for arbitrary manifolds (indeed, for arbitrary topological spaces) but the 2-dimensional setting is the most studied in group theory.

The mapping class group of surfaces are related to various other groups, in particular braid groups and outer automorphism groups.

== History ==
The mapping class group appeared in the first half of the twentieth century. Its origins lie in the study of the topology of hyperbolic surfaces, and especially in the study of the intersections of closed curves on these surfaces. The earliest contributors were Max Dehn and Jakob Nielsen: Dehn proved finite generation of the group, and Nielsen gave a classification of mapping classes and proved that all automorphisms of the fundamental group of a surface can be represented by homeomorphisms (the Dehn–Nielsen–Baer theorem).

The Dehn–Nielsen theory was reinterpreted in the mid-seventies by Thurston who gave the subject a more geometric flavour and used this work to great effect in his program for the study of three-manifolds.

More recently the mapping class group has been by itself a central topic in geometric group theory, where it provides a testing ground for various conjectures and techniques.

== Definition and examples ==
=== Mapping class group of orientable surfaces ===
Let $S$ be a connected, closed, orientable surface and $\operatorname{Homeo}^+(S)$ the group of orientation-preserving, or positive, homeomorphisms of $S$. This group has a natural topology, the compact-open topology. It can be defined easily by a distance function: if we are given a metric $d$ on $S$ inducing its topology then the function defined by

$$\delta(f, g) = \sup_{x \in S} \left( d(f(x), g(x)) \right)$$

is a distance inducing the compact-open topology on $\operatorname{Homeo}^+(S)$. The connected component of the identity for this topology is denoted $\operatorname{Homeo}_0(S)$. By definition it is equal to the homeomorphisms of $S$ which are isotopic to the identity. It is a normal subgroup of the group of positive homeomorphisms, and the mapping class group of $S$ is the group

$$\operatorname{Mod}(S) = \operatorname{Homeo}^+(S) / \operatorname{Homeo}_0(S)$$.

This is a countable group.

If we modify the definition to include all homeomorphisms we obtain the extended mapping class group $\operatorname{Mod}^\pm(S)$, which contains the mapping class group as a subgroup of index 2.

This definition can also be made in the differentiable category: if we replace all instances of "homeomorphism" above with "diffeomorphism" we obtain the same group, that is the inclusion $\operatorname{Diff}^+(S) \subset \operatorname{Homeo}^+(S)$ induces an isomorphism between the quotients by their respective identity components.

=== The mapping class groups of the sphere and the torus ===
Suppose that $S$ is the unit sphere in $\mathbb R^3$. Then any homeomorphism of $S$ is isotopic to either the identity or to the restriction to $S$ of the symmetry in the plane $z=0$. The latter is not orientation-preserving and we see that the mapping class group of the sphere is trivial, and its extended mapping class group is $\mathbb Z/2\mathbb Z$, the cyclic group of order 2.

The mapping class group of the torus $\mathbb T^2 = \mathbb R^2/\mathbb Z^2$ is naturally identified with the modular group $\operatorname{SL}_2(\mathbb Z)$. It is easy to construct a morphism $\Phi : \operatorname{SL}_2(\mathbb Z) \to \operatorname{Mod}(\mathbb T^2)$: every $A \in \operatorname{SL}_2(\mathbb Z)$ induces a diffeomorphism of $\mathbb T^2$ via $x + \mathbb Z^2 \mapsto Ax + \mathbb Z^2$. The action of diffeomorphisms on the first homology group of $\mathbb T^2$ gives a left-inverse $\Pi$ to the morphism $\Phi$ (proving in particular that it is injective) and it can be checked that $\Pi$ is injective, so that $\Pi, \Phi$ are inverse isomorphisms between $\operatorname{Mod}(\mathbb T^2)$ and $\operatorname{SL}_2(\mathbb Z)$. In the same way, the extended mapping class group of $\mathbb T^2$ is $\operatorname{GL}_2(\mathbb Z)$.

=== Mapping class group of surfaces with boundary and punctures ===
In the case where $S$ is a compact surface with a non-empty boundary $\partial S$ then the definition of the mapping class group needs to be more precise. The group $\operatorname{Homeo}^+(S, \partial S)$ of homeomorphisms relative to the boundary is the subgroup of $\operatorname{Homeo}^+(S)$ which restrict to the identity on the boundary, and the subgroup $\operatorname{Homeo}_0(S, \partial S)$ is the connected component of the identity. The mapping class group is then defined as

$$\operatorname{Mod}(S) = \operatorname{Homeo}^+(S, \partial S) / \operatorname{Homeo}_0(S, \partial S)$$.

A surface with punctures is a compact surface with a finite number of points removed ("punctures"). The mapping class group of such a surface is defined as above (note that the mapping classes are allowed to permute the punctures, but not the boundary components).

=== Mapping class group of an annulus ===
Any annulus is homeomorphic to the subset $A_0 = \{ 1 \le |z| \le 2\}$ of $\mathbb C$. One can define a diffeomorphism $\tau_0$ by the following formula:

$$\tau_0(z) = e^{2i\pi|z|}z$$

which is the identity on both boundary components $\{|z|=1\}, \{|z|=2\}$. The mapping class group of $A$ is then generated by the class of $\tau_0$. Hence, $\operatorname{Mod}(A) \cong \mathbb Z$.

=== Braid groups and mapping class groups ===
Braid groups can be defined as the mapping class groups of a disc with punctures. More precisely, the braid group on n strands is naturally isomorphic to the mapping class group of a disc with n punctures.

=== The Dehn–Nielsen–Baer theorem ===
If $S$ is closed and $f$ is a homeomorphism of $S$ then we can define an automorphism $f_*$ of the fundamental group $\pi_1(S, x_0)$ as follows: fix a path $\gamma$ between $x_0$ and $f(x_0)$ and for a loop $\alpha$ based at $x_0$ representing an element $[\alpha] \in \pi_1(S, x_0)$ define $f_*([\alpha])$ to be the element of the fundamental group associated to the loop $\bar \gamma * f(\alpha) * \gamma$. This automorphism depends on the choice of $\gamma$, but only up to conjugation. Thus we get a well-defined map from $\operatorname{Homeo}(S)$ to the outer automorphism group $\operatorname{Out}(\pi_1(S, x_0))$. This map is a morphism and its kernel is exactly the subgroup $\operatorname{Homeo}_0(S)$. The Dehn–Nielsen–Baer theorem states that it is in addition surjective. In particular, it implies that:

The extended mapping class group $\operatorname{Mod}^\pm (S)$ is isomorphic to the outer automorphism group $\operatorname{Out}(\pi_1(S))$.

The image of the mapping class group is an index 2 subgroup of the outer automorphism group, which can be characterised by its action on homology.

The conclusion of the theorem does not hold when $S$ has a non-empty boundary (except in a finite number of cases). In this case the fundamental group is a free group and the outer automorphism group Out(Fn) is strictly larger than the image of the mapping class group via the morphism defined in the previous paragraph. The image is exactly those outer automorphisms which preserve each conjugacy class in the fundamental group corresponding to a boundary component.

=== The Birman exact sequence ===
This is an exact sequence relating the mapping class group of surfaces with the same genus and boundary but a different number of punctures. It is a fundamental tool which allows to use recursive arguments in the study of mapping class groups. It was proven by Joan Birman in 1969. The exact statement is as follows.

Let $S$ be a compact surface and $x \in S$. There is an exact sequence

$$1 \to \pi_1(S, x) \to \operatorname{Mod}(S \setminus \{x\}) \to \operatorname{Mod}(S) \to 1$$.

In the case where $S$ itself has punctures the mapping class group $\operatorname{Mod}(S \setminus \{x\})$ must be replaced by the finite-index subgroup of mapping classes fixing $x$.

== Elements of the mapping class group ==
=== Dehn twists ===
If $c$ is an oriented simple closed curve on $S$ and one chooses a closed tubular neighbourhood $A$ then there is a homeomorphism $f$ from $A$ to the canonical annulus $A_0$ defined above, sending $c$ to a circle with the counterclockwise orientation. This is used to define a homeomorphism $\tau_c$ of $S$ as follows: on $S \setminus A$ it is the identity, and on $A$ it is equal to $f^{-1} \circ \tau_0 \circ f$. The class of $\tau_c$ in the mapping class group $\operatorname{Mod}(S)$ does not depend on the choice of $f$ made above, and the resulting element is called the Dehn twist about $c$. If $c$ is not null-homotopic this mapping class is nontrivial, and more generally the Dehn twists defined by two non-homotopic curves are distinct elements in the mapping class group.

In the mapping class group of the torus identified with $\operatorname{SL}_2(\mathbb Z)$ the Dehn twists correspond to unipotent matrices. For example, the matrix

$$\begin{pmatrix} 1 & 1 \\ 0 & 1 \end{pmatrix}$$

corresponds to the Dehn twist about a horizontal curve in the torus.

=== The Nielsen–Thurston classification ===
There is a classification of the mapping classes on a surface, originally due to Nielsen and rediscovered by Thurston, which can be stated as follows. An element $g \in \operatorname{Mod}(S)$ is either:

- of finite order (i.e. there exists $n > 0$ such that $g^n$ is the identity),
- reducible: there exists a set of disjoint closed curves on $S$ which is preserved by the action of $g$;
- or pseudo-Anosov.

The main content of the theorem is that a mapping class which is neither of finite order nor reducible must be pseudo-Anosov, which can be defined explicitly by dynamical properties.

=== Pseudo-Anosov diffeomorphisms ===
The study of pseudo-Anosov diffeomorphisms of a surface is fundamental. They are the most interesting diffeomorphisms, since finite-order mapping classes are isotopic to isometries and thus well understood, and the study of reducible classes indeed essentially reduces to the study of mapping classes on smaller surfaces which may themselves be either finite order or pseudo-Anosov.

Pseudo-Anosov mapping classes are "generic" in the mapping class group in various ways. For example, a random walk on the mapping class group will end on a pseudo-Anosov element with a probability tending to 1 as the number of steps grows.

== Actions of the mapping class group ==
=== Action on Teichmüller space ===
Given a punctured surface $S$ (usually without boundary) the Teichmüller space $T(S)$ is the space of marked complex (equivalently, conformal or complete hyperbolic) structures on $S$. These are represented by pairs $(X,f)$ where $X$ is a Riemann surface and $f : S \to X$ a homeomorphism, modulo a suitable equivalence relation. There is an obvious action of the group $\operatorname{Homeo}^+(S)$ on such pairs, which descends to an action of $\operatorname{Mod}(S)$ on Teichmüller space.

This action has many interesting properties; for example it is properly discontinuous (though not free). It is compatible with various geometric structures (metric or complex) with which $T(S)$ can be endowed. In particular, the Teichmüller metric can be used to establish some large-scale properties of the mapping class group, for example that the maximal quasi-isometrically embedded flats in $\operatorname{Mod}(S)$ are of dimension $3g-3 + k$.

The action extends to the Thurston boundary of Teichmüller space, and the Nielsen-Thurston classification of mapping classes can be seen in the dynamical properties of the action on Teichmüller space together with its Thurston boundary. Namely:

- Finite-order elements fix a point inside Teichmüller space (more concretely this means that any mapping class of finite order in $\operatorname{Mod}(S)$ can be realised as an isometry for some hyperbolic metric on $S$);
- Pseudo-Anosov classes fix the two points on the boundary corresponding to their stable and unstable foliation and the action is minimal (has a dense orbit) on the boundary;
- Reducible classes do not act minimally on the boundary.

=== Action on the curve complex ===
The curve complex of a surface $S$ is a complex whose vertices are isotopy classes of simple closed curves on $S$. The action of the mapping class groups $\operatorname{Mod}(S)$ on the vertices carries over to the full complex. The action is not properly discontinuous (the stabiliser of a simple closed curve is an infinite group).

This action, together with combinatorial and geometric properties of the curve complex, can be used to prove various properties of the mapping class group. In particular, it explains some of the hyperbolic properties of the mapping class group: while as mentioned in the previous section the mapping class group is not a hyperbolic group it has some properties reminiscent of those.

=== Other complexes with a mapping class group action ===
==== Pants complex ====
The pants complex of a compact surface $S$ is a complex whose vertices are the pants decompositions of $S$ (isotopy classes of maximal systems of disjoint simple closed curves). The action of $\operatorname{Mod}(S)$ extends to an action on this complex. This complex is quasi-isometric to Teichmüller space endowed with the Weil–Petersson metric.

==== Markings complex ====
The stabilisers of the mapping class group's action on the curve and pants complexes are quite large. The markings complex is a complex whose vertices are markings of $S$, which are acted upon by, and have trivial stabilisers in, the mapping class group $\operatorname{Mod}(S)$. It is (in opposition to the curve or pants complex) a locally finite complex which is quasi-isometric to the mapping class group.

A marking (Note: We describe here only "clean, complete" (in the terminology of Masur & Minsky (2000)) markings.) is determined by a pants decomposition $\alpha_1, \ldots, \alpha_\xi$ and a collection of transverse curves $\beta_1, \ldots, \beta_\xi$ such that every one of the $\beta_i$ intersects at most one of the $\alpha_i$, and this "minimally" (this is a technical condition which can be stated as follows: if $\alpha_i, \beta_i$ are contained in a subsurface homeomorphic to a torus then they intersect once, and if the surface is a four-holed sphere they intersect twice). Two distinct markings are joined by an edge if they differ by an "elementary move", and the full complex is obtained by adding all possible higher-dimensional simplices.

== Generators and relations for mapping class groups ==
=== The Dehn–Lickorish theorem ===
The mapping class group is generated by the subset of Dehn twists about all simple closed curves on the surface. The Dehn–Lickorish theorem states that it is sufficient to select a finite number of those to generate the mapping class group. This generalises the fact that $\operatorname{SL}_2(\mathbb Z)$ is generated by the matrices

$$\begin{pmatrix} 1 & 1 \\ 0 & 1 \end{pmatrix},  \begin{pmatrix} 1 & 0 \\ 1 & 1 \end{pmatrix}$$.

In particular, the mapping class group of a surface is a finitely generated group.

The smallest number of Dehn twists that can generate the mapping class group of a closed surface of genus $g \ge 2$ is $2g + 1$; this was proven later by Humphries.

=== Finite presentability ===
It is possible to prove that all relations between the Dehn twists in a generating set for the mapping class group can be written as combinations of a finite number among them. This means that the mapping class group of a surface is a finitely presented group.

One way to prove this theorem is to deduce it from the properties of the action of the mapping class group on the pants complex: the stabiliser of a vertex is seen to be finitely presented, and the action is cofinite. Since the complex is connected and simply connected it follows that the mapping class group must be finitely generated. There are other ways of getting finite presentations, but in practice the only one to yield explicit relations for every genus is that described in this paragraph with a slightly different complex instead of the curve complex, called the cut system complex.

An example of a relation between Dehn twists occurring in this presentation is the lantern relation.

=== Other systems of generators ===
There are other interesting systems of generators for the mapping class group besides Dehn twists. For example, $\operatorname{Mod}(S)$ can be generated by two elements or by involutions.

=== Cohomology of the mapping class group ===
If $S$ is a surface of genus $g$ with $b$ boundary components and $k$ punctures then the virtual cohomological dimension of $\operatorname{Mod}(S)$ is equal to $4g - 4 + b + k$.

The first homology of the mapping class group is finite and it follows that the first cohomology group is finite as well.

== Subgroups of the mapping class groups ==
=== The Torelli subgroup ===
As singular homology is functorial, the mapping class group $\operatorname{Mod}(S)$ acts by automorphisms on the first homology group $H_1(S)$. This is a free abelian group of rank $2g$ if $S$ is closed of genus $g$. This action thus gives a linear representation $\operatorname{Mod}(S) \to \operatorname{GL}_{2g}(\mathbb Z)$.

This map is in fact a surjection with image equal to the integer points $\operatorname{Sp}_{2g}(\mathbb Z)$ of the symplectic group. This comes from the fact that the intersection number of closed curves induces a symplectic form on the first homology, which is preserved by the action of the mapping class group. The surjectivity is proven by showing that the images of Dehn twists generate $\operatorname{Sp}_{2g}(\mathbb Z)$.

The kernel of the morphism $\operatorname{Mod}(S) \to \operatorname{Sp}_{2g}(\mathbb Z)$ is called the Torelli group of $S$. It is a finitely generated, torsion-free subgroup and its study is of fundamental importance for its bearing on both the structure of the mapping class group itself (since the arithmetic group $\operatorname{Sp}_{2g}(\mathbb Z)$ is comparatively very well understood, a lot of facts about $\operatorname{Mod}(S)$ boil down to a statement about its Torelli subgroup) and applications to 3-dimensional topology and algebraic geometry.

=== Residual finiteness and finite-index subgroups ===
An example of application of the Torelli subgroup is the following result:

The mapping class group is residually finite.

The proof proceeds first by using residual finiteness of the linear group $\operatorname{Sp}_{2g}(\mathbb Z)$, and then, for any nontrivial element of the Torelli group, constructing by geometric means subgroups of finite index which does not contain it.

An interesting class of finite-index subgroups is given by the kernels of the morphisms:

$$\Phi_n: \operatorname{Mod}(S)  \to \operatorname{Sp}_{2g}(\mathbb Z) \to \operatorname{Sp}_{2g}(\mathbb Z / n\mathbb Z)$$

The kernel of $\Phi_n$ is usually called a congruence subgroup of $\operatorname{Mod}(S)$. It is a torsion-free group for all $n \ge 3$ (this follows easily from a classical result of Minkowski on linear groups and the fact that the Torelli group is torsion-free).

=== Finite subgroups ===
The mapping class group has only finitely many classes of finite groups, as follows from the fact that the finite-index subgroup $\ker(\Phi_3)$ is torsion-free, as discussed in the previous paragraph. Moreover, this also implies that any finite subgroup of $\operatorname{Mod}(S)$ is a subgroup of the finite group $\operatorname{Mod}(S) / \ker(\Phi_3) \cong \operatorname{Sp}_{2g}(\mathbb Z/3)$.

A bound on the order of finite subgroups can also be obtained through geometric means. The solution to the Nielsen realisation problem implies that any such group is realised as the group of isometries of an hyperbolic surface of genus $g$. Hurwitz's bound then implies that the maximal order is equal to $84(g-1)$.

=== General facts on subgroups ===
The mapping class groups satisfy the Tits alternative: that is, any subgroup of it either contains a non-abelian free subgroup or it is virtually solvable (in fact abelian).

Any subgroup which is not reducible (that is it does not preserve a set of isotopy class of disjoint simple closed curves) must contain a pseudo-Anosov element.

== Linear representations ==
It is an open question whether the mapping class group is a linear group or not. Besides the symplectic representation on homology explained above there are other interesting finite-dimensional linear representations arising from topological quantum field theory. The images of these representations are contained in arithmetic groups which are not symplectic, and this allows to construct many more finite quotients of $\operatorname{Mod}(S)$.

In the other direction there is a lower bound for the dimension of a (putative) faithful representation, which has to be at least $2\sqrt{g-1}$.

== Sources ==
- Birman, Joan (1969). "Mapping class groups and their relationship to braid groups". Communications on Pure and Applied Mathematics. 22 (2): 213–238. doi:10.1002/cpa.3160220206. MR 0243519.
- Birman, Joan S. (1974). Braids, links, and mapping class groups. Annals of Mathematics Studies. Vol. 82. Princeton University Press.
- Brendle, Tara E.; Farb, Benson (2004). "Every mapping class group is generated by 3 torsion elements and by 6 involutions". J. Algebra. 278. arXiv:math/0307039. doi:10.1016/j.jalgebra.2004.02.019. S2CID 14784932.
- Brock, Jeff (2002). "Pants decompositions and the Weil–Petersson metric". Complex Manifolds and Hyperbolic Geometry. American Mathematical Society. MR 1940162.
- Dehn, Max (1938). "Die Gruppe der Abbildungsklassen: Das arithmetische Feld auf Flächen". Acta Mathematica (in German). 69: 135–206. doi:10.1007/bf02547712, translated in Dehn 1987.
- Dehn, Max (1987). Papers on group theory and topology. translated and introduced by John Stillwell. Springer-Verlag. ISBN 978-038796416-4.
- Eskin, Alex; Masur, Howard; Rafi, Kasra (2017). "Large-scale rank of Teichmüller space". Duke Mathematical Journal. 166 (8). arXiv:1307.3733. doi:10.1215/00127094-0000006X. S2CID 15393033.
- Farb, Benson; Lubotzky, Alexander; Minsky, Yair (2001). "Rank-1 phenomena for mapping class groups". Duke Mathematical Journal. 106 (3): 581–597. doi:10.1215/s0012-7094-01-10636-4. MR 1813237.
- Farb, Benson; Margalit, Dan (2012). A primer on mapping class groups. Princeton Mathematical Series. Princeton University press. ISBN 978-069114794-9.
- Fathi, Albert; Laudenbach, François; Poénaru, Valentin (2012). Thurston's work on surfaces. Mathematical Notes. Vol. 48. translated from the 1979 French original by Djun M. Kim and Dan Margalit. Princeton University Press. pp. xvi+254. ISBN 978-0-691-14735-2.
- Hatcher, Allen; Thurston, William (1980). "A presentation for the mapping class group of a closed orientable surface". Topology. 19 (3): 221–237. doi:10.1016/0040-9383(80)90009-9.
- Ivanov, Nikolai (1992). Subgroups of Teichmüller Modular Groups. Translations of Mathematical Monographs. American Mathematical Society. ISBN 978-1-4704-4526-3.
- Masbaum, Gregor; Reid, Alan W. (2012). "All finite groups are involved in the mapping class group". Geometry & Topology. 16 (3): 1393–1411. arXiv:1106.4261. doi:10.2140/gt.2012.16.1393. MR 2967055. S2CID 17330187.
- Masur, Howard A.; Minsky, Yair N. (1999). "Geometry of the complex of curves. I. Hyperbolicity". Inventiones Mathematicae. 138 (1): 103–149. arXiv:math/9804098. Bibcode:1999InMat.138..103M. doi:10.1007/s002220050343. MR 1714338. S2CID 16199015.
- Masur, Howard A.; Minsky, Yair N. (2000). "Geometry of the complex of curves II: Hierarchical structure". Geometric & Functional Analysis. 10 (4): 902–974. arXiv:math/9807150. doi:10.1007/pl00001643. S2CID 14834205.
- Putman, Andy (2010). "A note on the abelianizations of finite-index subgroups of the mapping class group". Proceedings of the American Mathematical Society. 138 (2): 753–758. arXiv:0812.0017. doi:10.1090/s0002-9939-09-10124-7. MR 2557192. S2CID 2047111.
- Thurston, William P. (1988). "On the geometry and dynamics of diffeomorphisms of surfaces". Bulletin of the American Mathematical Society. 19 (2): 417–431. doi:10.1090/s0273-0979-1988-15685-6. MR 0956596.
- Wajnryb, B. (1996). "Mapping class group of a surface is generated by two elements". Topology. 35 (2): 377–383. doi:10.1016/0040-9383(95)00037-2.
