= Karin Melnick =

American mathematician

- Born: 1977 (age 48–49); Marin County, California, U.S.
- Education: PhD, 2006 University of Chicago
- Known for: Differential geometry
- Scientific career
- Fields: Mathematics
- Workplaces: University of Luxembourg; University of Maryland, College Park; Yale University
- Doctoral advisor: Benson Farb

Karin Melnick (born 1977) is an American mathematician and Professor at the University of Luxembourg. She specializes in differential geometry and was awarded the 2020–2021 Joan and Joseph Birman Fellowship for Women Scholars by the American Mathematical Society.

== Research ==
Melnick's primary research area is in differential-geometric aspects of rigidity, where she focuses on global and local results relating the automorphisms of a differential-geometric structure with the geometric and topological properties of the space. In addition, she is a leader in research in Lorentzian geometry and has done substantial work on the Lorentzian Lichnerowicz conjecture.

Melnick also has research interests in conformal pseudo-Riemannian structures, parabolic Cartan geometries in general, and smooth dynamics.

== Education ==
Melnick received her PhD in Mathematics from the University of Chicago in 2006, where she also earned her Master of Science in Mathematics in 2000, while working under the guidance of doctoral advisor Benson Farb. Her dissertation research focused on compact Lorentz manifolds with local symmetry. Prior to her graduate studies, Melnick received her Bachelor of Arts, also in Mathematics, from Reed College in 1999.

== Career ==
Melnick currently works as a professor in the Department of Mathematics at the University of Luxembourg. She was an assistant professor beginning in 2009 at the University of Maryland, where she was promoted to associate professor in 2014 and to full professor in 2021. Before working at UMD, Melnick held the position of Gibbs Assistant Professor at Yale University while on an NSF Postdoctoral Research Fellowship.

== Honors ==
Melnick was awarded the 2020–2021 Joan and Joseph Birman Fellowship for Women Scholars by the American Mathematical Society for her research on differential-geometric aspects of rigidity. This prestigious fellowship, founded by mathematician Joan Birman and physicist Joseph L. Birman, is awarded to talented, mid-career women with a significant record of research in a core area of mathematics.

Melnick has previously been awarded an NSF CAREER Grant (2013), an AMS Centennial Fellowship (2012–2013), and a Junior Research Fellowship from the Erwin Schrödinger Institute (2009).
