= Braids, Links, and Mapping Class Groups =

Mathematical monograph on braid groups

- Author: Joan Birman
- Subject: Braid groups in low-dimensional topology
- Publisher: Princeton University Press
- Publication date: 1974
- ISBN: 978-0-691-08149-6

Braids, Links, and Mapping Class Groups is a mathematical monograph on braid groups and their applications in low-dimensional topology. It was written by Joan Birman, and published in 1974 by the Princeton University Press and University of Tokyo Press, as volume 82 of the book series Annals of Mathematics Studies.

Although braid groups had been introduced in 1891 by Adolf Hurwitz and formalized in 1925 by Emil Artin, this was the first book devoted to them. It has been described as a "seminal work", one that "laid the foundations for several new subfields in topology".

== Topics ==
Braids, Links, and Mapping Class Groups is organized into five chapters and an appendix. The first introductory chapter defines braid groups, configuration spaces, and the use of configuration spaces to define braid groups on arbitrary two-dimensional manifolds. It provides a solution to the word problem for braids, the question of determining whether two different-looking braid presentations really describe the same group element. It also describes the braid groups as automorphism groups of free groups and of multiply-punctured disks.

The next three chapters present connections of braid groups to three different areas of mathematics. Chapter 2 concerns applications to knot theory, via Alexander's theorem that every knot or link can be formed by closing off a braid, and provides the first complete proof of the Markov theorem on equivalence of links formed in this way. It also includes material on the conjugacy problem, important in this area because conjugate braids close off to form the same link, and on the "algebraic link problem" (not to be confused with algebraic links) in which one must determine whether two links can be related to each other by finitely many moves of a certain type, equivalent to the homeomorphism of link complements. Chapter 3 concerns representation theory, and includes Fox derivatives and Fox's free differential calculus, the Magnus representation of free groups and the Gassner and Burau representations of braid groups. Chapter 4 concerns the mapping class groups of 2-manifolds, Dehn twists and the Lickorish twist theorem, and plats, braids closed off in a different way than in Alexander's theorem.

Chapter 5 is titled "plats and links". It moves from 2-dimensional topology to 3-dimensional topology, and is more speculative, concerning connections between braid groups, 3-manifolds, and the classification of links. It includes also an analog of Alexander's theorem for plats, where the number of strands of the resulting plat turns out to be determined by the bridge number of a given link. The appendix provides a list of 34 open problems. By the time Wilbur Whitten wrote his review, in June 1975, a handful of these had already been solved.

== Audience and reception ==
This is a book for advanced mathematics students and professionals, who are expected to already be familiar with algebraic topology and presentations of groups by generators and relators. Although it is not a textbook, it could possibly be used for graduate seminars.

Reviewer Lee Neuwirth calls the book "most readable", "a nice mix of known results on the subject and new material". Whitten describes it as "thorough, skillfully written" and "a pleasure to read". Wilhelm Magnus finds it "remarkable" that while covering the subject with full mathematical rigor, Birman has preserved the intuitive appeal of some of its earliest works.
