= Lawrence–Krammer representation =

Braid group representation

In mathematics the Lawrence–Krammer representation is a representation of the braid groups. It fits into a family of representations called the Lawrence representations. The first Lawrence representation is the Burau representation and the second is the Lawrence–Krammer representation.

The Lawrence–Krammer representation is named after Ruth Lawrence and Daan Krammer.

== Definition ==
Consider the braid group $B_n$ to be the mapping class group of a disc with n marked points, $P_n$. The Lawrence–Krammer representation is defined as the action of $B_n$ on the homology of a certain covering space of the configuration space $C_2 P_n$. Specifically, the first integral homology group of $C_2 P_n$ is isomorphic to $\mathbb Z^{n+1}$, and the subgroup of $H_1 (C_2 P_n,\mathbb{Z})$ invariant under the action of $B_n$ is primitive, free abelian, and of rank 2. Generators for this invariant subgroup are denoted by $q, t$.

The covering space of $C_2 P_n$ corresponding to the kernel of the projection map

$$\pi_1 (C_2 P_n) \to \mathbb{Z}^2 \langle q,t \rangle$$

is called the Lawrence–Krammer cover and is denoted $\overline{C_2 P_n}$. Diffeomorphisms of $P_n$ act on $P_n$, thus also on $C_2 P_n$, moreover they lift uniquely to diffeomorphisms of $\overline{C_2 P_n}$ which restrict to the identity on the co-dimension two boundary stratum (where both points are on the boundary circle). The action of $B_n$ on

$$H_2 (\overline{C_2 P_n},\mathbb{Z}),$$

thought of as a

$\mathbb Z\langle t^{\pm},q^{\pm}\rangle$-module,

is the Lawrence–Krammer representation. The group $H_2 (\overline{C_2 P_n},\mathbb{Z})$ is known to be a free $\mathbb Z\langle t^{\pm},q^{\pm}\rangle$-module, of rank $n (n-1)/ 2$.

== Matrices ==
Using Bigelow's conventions for the Lawrence–Krammer representation, generators for the group $H_2 (\overline{C_2 P_n},\mathbb{Z})$ are denoted $v_{j,k}$ for $1 \leq j < k \leq n$. Letting $\sigma_i$ denote the standard Artin generators of the braid group, we obtain the expression:

$\sigma_i\cdot v_{j,k} = \left\{ \begin{array}{lr} v_{j,k} & i\notin \{j-1,j,k-1,k\}, \\ qv_{i,k} + (q^2-q)v_{i,j} + (1-q)v_{j,k} & i=j-1 \\ v_{j+1,k} & i=j\neq k-1, \\ qv_{j,i} + (1-q)v_{j,k} - (q^2-q)tv_{i,k} & i=k-1\neq j,\\ v_{j,k+1} & i=k,\\ -tq^2v_{j,k} & i=j=k-1. \end{array} \right.$

== Faithfulness ==
Stephen Bigelow and Daan Krammer have given independent proofs that the Lawrence–Krammer representation is faithful.

== Geometry ==
The Lawrence–Krammer representation preserves a non-degenerate sesquilinear form which is known to be negative-definite Hermitian provided $q, t$ are specialized to suitable unit complex numbers (q near 1 and t near i). Thus the braid group is a subgroup of the unitary group of square matrices of size $n(n-1)/2$. Recently it has been shown that the image of the Lawrence–Krammer representation is a dense subgroup of the unitary group in this case.

The sesquilinear form has the explicit description:

$\langle v_{i,j}, v_{k,l}\rangle = -(1-t)(1+qt)(q-1)^2t^{-2}q^{-3} \left\{ \begin{array}{lr} -q^2t^2(q-1) & i=k<j<l \text{ or } i<k<j=l \\ -(q-1) & k=i<l<j \text{ or } k<i<j=l \\ t(q-1) & i<j=k<l \\ q^2t(q-1) & k<l=i<j \\ -t(q-1)^2(1+qt) & i<k<j<l \\ (q-1)^2(1+qt) & k<i<l<j \\ (1-qt)(1+q^2t) & k=i, j=l \\ 0 & \text{otherwise} \\ \end{array} \right.$
