= Joan & Joseph Birman Research Prize in Topology and Geometry =

The Joan & Joseph Birman Research Prize in Topology and Geometry is a prize given every other year by the Association for Women in Mathematics to an outstanding young female researcher in topology or geometry. The prize fund for the award was endowed by a donation in 2013 from Joan Birman and her husband, Joseph Birman, and first awarded in 2015.

== Winners ==
- Elisenda Grigsby (2015), for her research in low-dimensional topology, particularly in knot theory and categorified invariants.
- Emmy Murphy (2017), for her research in symplectic geometry where she developed new techniques for studying symplectic manifolds and contact geometry.
- Kathryn Mann (2019), for "major breakthroughs in the theory of dynamics of group actions on manifolds".
- Emily Riehl (2021), for "deep and foundational work in category theory and homotopy theory".
- Kristen Hendricks (2023), for "highly influential work on equivariant aspects of Floer homology theories".
- Mona Merling (2025), for "innovative and impactful research in algebraic K-theory, equivariant homotopy theory, and their applications to manifold theory".

== See also ==
- List of awards honoring women
- List of mathematics awards
