= Spherical braid group =

Generalized Braid group on the Sphere

In mathematics, the spherical braid group or Hurwitz braid group is a braid group on n strands. In comparison with the usual braid group, it has an additional group relation that comes from the strands being on the sphere. The group also has relations to the inverse Galois problem.

== Definition ==
The spherical braid group on n strands, denoted $SB_n$ or $B_n(S^2)$, is defined as the fundamental group of the configuration space of the sphere:
$$B_n(S^2) = \pi_1(\mathrm{Conf}_n(S^2)).$$
The spherical braid group has a presentation in terms of generators $\sigma_1, \sigma_2, \cdots, \sigma_{n - 1}$ with the following relations:

- $\sigma_i \sigma_j = \sigma_j \sigma_i$ for $|i-j| \geq 2$
- $\sigma_i \sigma_{i+1} \sigma_i = \sigma_{i+1} \sigma_i \sigma_{i+1}$ for $1 \leq i \leq n - 2$ (the Yang–Baxter equation)
- $\sigma_1 \sigma_2 \cdots \sigma_{n-1} \sigma_{n-1} \sigma_{n-2} \cdots \sigma_{1} = 1$

The last relation distinguishes the group from the usual braid group.
