= William Abikoff =

American mathematician

William Abikoff (born 1944) is an American mathematician. He has been a professor of mathematics at the University of Connecticut since 1981.

Abikoff earned his Ph.D. in 1971 from the New York University Polytechnic School of Engineering under the supervision of Georges Gustave Weill. In 2012, Abikoff became a Fellow of the American Mathematical Society.

== Research ==
In 1975, Abikoff introduced the idea of an "augmented Teichmüller space", which is obtained as a Teichmüller space along with regular b-groups on its boundary. He showed that every element of the Teichmüller modular group can be extended to an automorphism of the corresponding augmented Teichmüller space.

== Selected works ==
- Abikoff, William (1986). "The Euler characteristic and inequalities for Kleinian groups". Proceedings of the American Mathematical Society. 97 (4): 593–601. doi:10.1090/s0002-9939-1986-0845971-7. MR 0845971.
- Abikoff, William; Harvey, William J. (2012). "Extremal Kleinian groups". Proceedings of the American Mathematical Society. 140: 267–278. doi:10.1090/s0002-9939-2011-10923-7. MR 2833539.
- Abikoff, William (1980). The Real Analytic Theory of Teichmüller Space. Lecture Notes in Mathematics. Vol. 820. Berlin: Springer. ISBN 038710237X. MR 0590044.
