= Ruth Lawrence =

British-Israeli mathematician

- רות אלקה לורנס-נאימרק
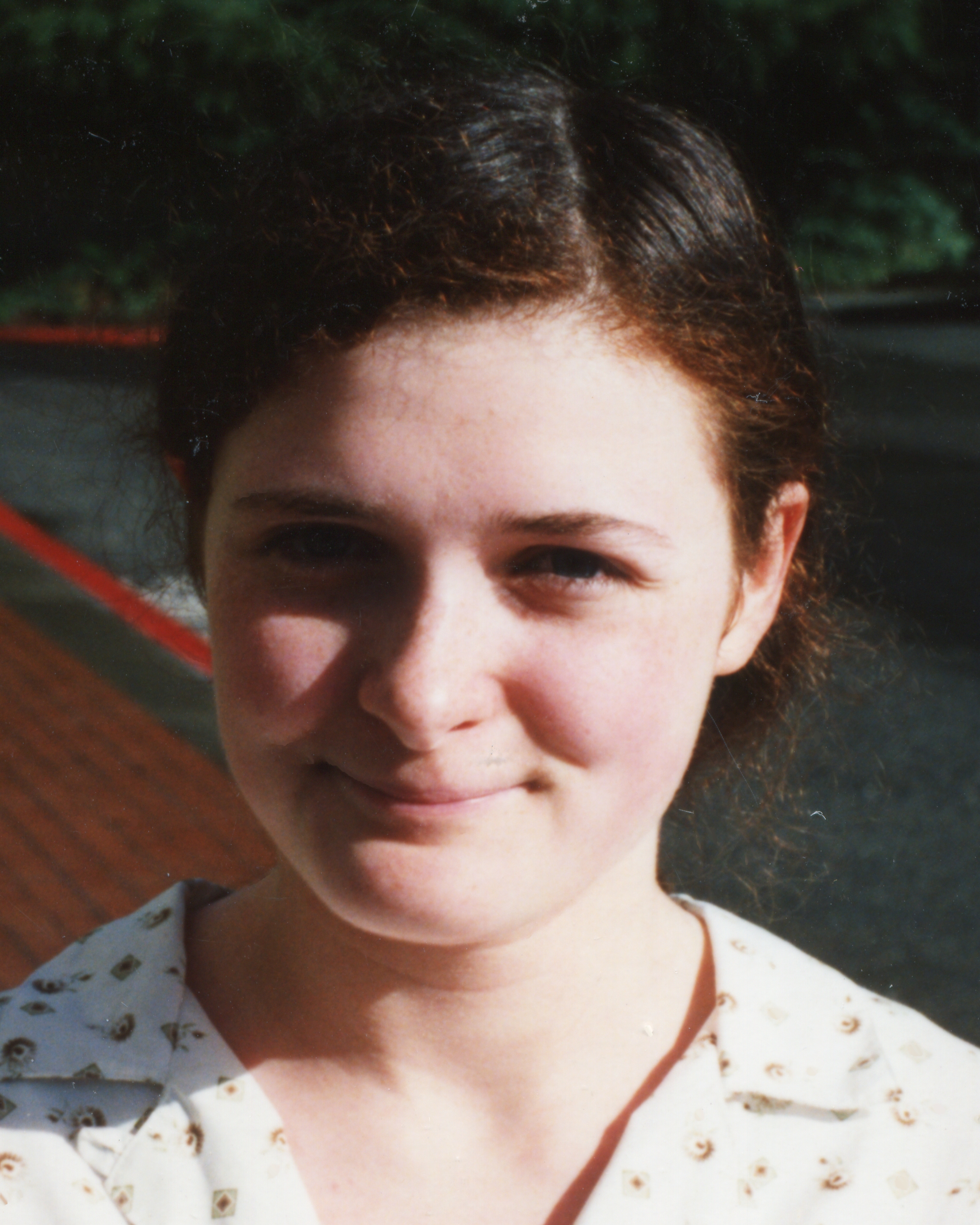
- Ruth Lawrence, Berkeley 1991
- Born: 2 August 1971 (age 55); Brighton, England
- Education: University of Oxford (MA, DPhil)
- Known for: Being a child prodigy Lawrence–Krammer representation
- Awards: Fellow of the American Mathematical Society
- Scientific career
- Fields: Topology, knot theory
- Workplaces: Hebrew University of Jerusalem; University of Michigan
- Thesis: Homology representations of braid groups (1989)
- Doctoral advisor: Michael Atiyah

Ruth Elke Lawrence-Neimark (Hebrew: רות אלקה לורנס-נאימרק; born 2 August 1971) is a British-Israeli mathematician and a professor of mathematics at the Einstein Institute of Mathematics, Hebrew University of Jerusalem, and a researcher in knot theory and algebraic topology. In the public eye, she is best known for having been a child prodigy in mathematics. In 2012, she became a fellow of the American Mathematical Society.

== Early life ==
Ruth Lawrence was born in Brighton, England, and raised in Huddersfield, West Yorkshire. Her parents, Harry Lawrence and Sylvia Greybourne, were both computer consultants. When Lawrence was five, her father gave up his job so that he could educate her at home. She is Jewish.

== Education ==
At the age of nine, Lawrence gained an O-level in mathematics, setting a new age record (later surpassed in 2001 when Arran Fernandez successfully sat GCSE mathematics aged five). Also at the age of nine she achieved a Grade A at A-level pure mathematics.

In 1981, Lawrence passed the University of Oxford entrance examination in mathematics, joining St Hugh's College in 1983 at the age of 12.

At Oxford, her father continued to be actively involved in her education, accompanying her to all lectures and some tutorials. Lawrence completed her bachelor's degree in two years, instead of the normal three, and graduated in 1985 at the age of 13 with a congratulatory first and special commendation. Attracting considerable press interest, she became the youngest British person to gain a first-class degree, and the youngest to graduate from the University of Oxford in modern times.

Lawrence followed her first degree with a bachelor's degree in physics in 1986 and a Doctor of Philosophy (DPhil) degree in mathematics at Oxford in June 1989, at the age of 17. Her doctoral thesis title was Homology representations of braid groups and her thesis adviser was Sir Michael Atiyah.

== Academic career ==
Lawrence and her father moved to America for Lawrence's first academic post, which was at Harvard University, where she became a junior fellow in 1990 at the age of 19. In 1993, she moved to the University of Michigan, where she became an associate professor with tenure in 1997.

In 1998, Lawrence married Ariyeh Neimark, a mathematician at the Hebrew University of Jerusalem, and adopted the name Ruth Lawrence-Neimark. The following year, she moved to Israel with him and took up the post of associate professor of mathematics at the Einstein Institute of Mathematics, a part of the Hebrew University of Jerusalem.

== Research ==
Lawrence's 1990 paper "Homological representations of the Hecke algebra", in Communications in Mathematical Physics, introduced, among other things, certain novel linear representations of the braid group – known as Lawrence–Krammer representations. In papers published in 2000 and 2001, Daan Krammer and Stephen Bigelow established the faithfulness of Lawrence's representation. This result goes by the phrase "braid groups are linear."

== Awards and honours ==
In 2012, she became a fellow of the American Mathematical Society.

== Selected publications ==
- Griniasty, Itay; Lawrence, Ruth (2019). "An explicit symmetric DGLA model of a triangle". Higher Structures. 3 (1): 1–16. arXiv:1802.02795. doi:10.21136/HS.2019.01. MR 3939044.
- Lawrence, Ruth; Sullivan, Dennis (2014). "A formula for topology/deformations and its significance". Fundamenta Mathematicae. 225 (1): 229–242. arXiv:math/0610949. doi:10.4064/fm225-1-10. MR 3205571.
- Lawrence, R. J. (1990). "Homological representations of the Hecke algebra". Communications in Mathematical Physics. 135 (1): 141–191. Bibcode:1990CMaPh.135..141L. doi:10.1007/BF02097660. MR 1086755.
- Lawrence, Ruth; Zagier, Don (1999). "Modular forms and quantum invariants of 3-manifolds". Asian Journal of Mathematics. 3 (1): 93–107. doi:10.4310/AJM.1999.v3.n1.a5. MR 1701924.
- Lawrence, Ruth; Rozansky, Lev (1999). "Witten-Reshetikhin-Turaev invariants of Seifert manifolds". Communications in Mathematical Physics. 205 (2): 287–314. Bibcode:1999CMaPh.205..287L. doi:10.1007/s002200050678. hdl:2027.42/41998. MR 1712599.
