= Taback =

Taback is a surname. Notable people with the surname include:

- Jennifer Taback, American mathematician
- Joshua Taback, animated television director of Spirit Riding Free
- Simms Taback (1932–2011), American writer, graphic artist, and illustrator
