= Charles Livingston (mathematician) =

American mathematician topologist

Charles Livingston is an American mathematician working in geometric topology, low-dimensional topology and knot theory. He is a professor emeritus at Indiana University.

In 1982, he posed a conjecture on Seifert surfaces that remained open for 40 years. It was finally solved in 2022 in a collaborative effort of five mathematicians: Kyle Hayden, Seungwon Kim, Maggie Miller, JungHwan Park, and Isaac Sundberg.

His undergraduate studies were at University of California, Los Angeles and MIT. Livingston obtained his PhD in 1980 from the University of California, Berkeley, advised by Robion Kirby (thesis: The Knotting of Surfaces in 4-Spaces).

He is the author of the textbook Knot Theory (MAA). In 2004, he was awarded the Lester R. Ford Award from the Mathematical Association of America.

== Selected publications ==
=== Research papers ===
- "Surfaces bounding the unlink". Michigan Math. J., 29(3):289–298, 1982. (paper where he proposed his conjecture)
- with Paul Kirk: "Twisted Alexander invariants, Reidemeister torsion, and Casson–Gordon invariants", Topology 38 (3), 635–661
- "Computations of the Ozsváth–Szabó knot concordance invariant", Geometry & Topology 8 (2), 735–742
- "Heegaard Floer homology and rational cuspidal curves", Forum of Mathematics, Sigma 2, e28
- "Twisted knot polynomials: inversion, mutation and concordance", Topology 38 (3), 663–671

=== Textbooks ===
- Knot Theory (Mathematical Association of America Textbooks, Series Number 24)
