= Maggie Miller (mathematician) =

Mathematician and topologist

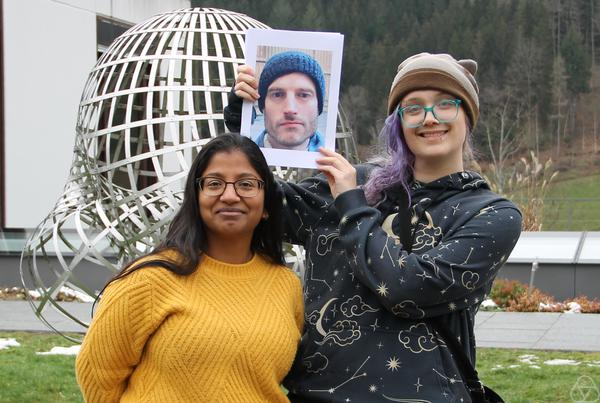
- Miller (right) in 2023
- Born: 1993 or 1994 (age 32–33)
- Education: Princeton University (PhD); University of Texas at Austin (BS)
- Known for: Low-dimensional topology Work on Seifert surfaces
- Awards: Maryam Mirzakhani New Frontiers Prize (2023); Sloan Research Fellowship (2025); Packard Fellowship for Science and Engineering (2025)
- Scientific career
- Fields: Mathematics, geometric topology
- Workplaces: University of Texas at Austin; Stanford University
- Thesis: Extending fibrations of knot complements to ribbon disk complements (2020)
- Doctoral advisor: David Gabai
- Website: web.ma.utexas.edu/users/maggiem/

Maggie Hall Miller (born in 1993 or 1994) is a mathematician whose primary area of research is low-dimensional topology. She is an assistant professor at the University of Texas at Austin. She is known for work on Seifert surfaces, including a 2022 result with Kyle Hayden, Seungwon Kim, JungHwan Park and Isaac Sundberg that answered a 1982 question of Charles Livingston by constructing Seifert surfaces for a knot that remain non‑isotopic in the 4‑ball; the paper was published in 2025 in the Journal of the European Mathematical Society. Her honors include the Maryam Mirzakhani New Frontiers Prize (2023), a Sloan Research Fellowship (2025), and a Packard Fellowship for Science and Engineering (2025).

== Contributions to mathematics ==
In 2022, together with Kyle Hayden, Seungwon Kim, JungHwan Park and Isaac Sundberg, Miller answered a 1982 question of Charles Livingston on Seifert surfaces by exhibiting surfaces for the same knot that remain non‑isotopic when their interiors are pushed into the 4‑ball. The results include examples that are not even topologically isotopic in the 4‑ball, examples that are topologically but not smoothly isotopic, and infinite families distinct up to isotopy rel. boundary. The work was published in the Journal of the European Mathematical Society in 2025.

Miller is one of the associate editors of the book K3: A New Problem List in Low-Dimensional Topology, published by the American Mathematical Society in 2026.

== Education and career ==
Miller completed her undergraduate studies at the University of Texas at Austin.

She earned her PhD in mathematics from Princeton University in 2020, with David Gabai as advisor (thesis: Extending fibrations of knot complements to ribbon disk complements).

After completing her doctoral degree, Miller worked as an NSF Postdoctoral Fellow from 2020 to 2021 at the Massachusetts Institute of Technology. Later as a Visiting Clay Fellow and Stanford Science Fellow, she spent time at Stanford University from 2021 to 2023. Miller is currently a tenure track professor at the University of Texas at Austin.

== Awards and honors ==
Miller was awarded a 2021 Clay Research Fellowship by the Clay Mathematics Institute for her work to expand topological research of manifolds. Her contributions were described by MIT as "important...to long-standing problems in low-dimensional topology." Clay Research Fellowships are awarded to recent PhD-holders who are selected for their research accomplishments and potential as leaders in mathematics research.

In her previous position at Stanford, she was a Stanford Science Fellow. Fellowships are awarded to early career scientists who have demonstrated scientific achievement and advancement, as well as a desire to collaborate with a diverse scholarly community.

Prior to her appointment at Stanford, Miller was awarded a National Science Foundation Mathematical Sciences Postdoc Research Fellowship while at MIT in the Department of Mathematics. She also has a record of accomplishment during her graduate studies, having been awarded the Princeton Mathematics Graduate Teaching Award in 2018 and the Charlotte Elizabeth Procter Fellowship in 2019.

She received the 2023 Maryam Mirzakhani New Frontiers Prize, one of the Breakthrough Prizes, for "work on fibered ribbon knots and surfaces in 4-dimensional manifolds.", and was named one of Forbes' 30 Under 30 – Science for 2023.

In 2025, Miller was awarded a Sloan Research Fellowship. In the same year, she received a Packard Fellowship for Science and Engineering.

She delivered a lecture titled Constructing Fibrations in 4D at the 2026 International Congress of Mathematicians.

== Selected publications ==
- Hayden, Kyle; Kim, Seungwon; Miller, Maggie; Park, JungHwan; Sundberg, Isaac (2025-09-29). "Seifert surfaces in the 4‑ball". Journal of the European Mathematical Society. arXiv:2205.15283. doi:10.4171/JEMS/1703.
- Juhász, András; Miller, Maggie; Zemke, Ian (2020). "Knot cobordisms, bridge index, and torsion in Floer homology". Journal of Topology. 13 (4): 1701–1724. arXiv:1904.02735. doi:10.1112/topo.12170. ISSN 1753-8416.
- Hughes, Mark C; Kim, Seungwon; Miller, Maggie (30 September 2020). "Isotopies of surfaces in 4–manifolds via banded unlink diagrams". Geometry & Topology. 24 (3): 1519–1569. arXiv:1804.09169. doi:10.2140/gt.2020.24.1519. ISSN 1364-0380.
