= Andrew Putman =

American mathematics professor (born 1979)

- Born: October 22, 1979 (age 46)
- Education: Rice University; University of Chicago
- Awards: Sloan Research Fellowship; National Science Foundation CAREER Award
- Scientific career
- Fields: Mathematics
- Workplaces: Rice University; University of Notre Dame
- Doctoral advisor: Benson Farb

Andrew Putman (born October 22, 1979) is an American mathematician at the University of Notre Dame. His research fields include geometric group theory and low-dimensional topology.

Putman earned his bachelor's degree from Rice University. In 2007, he obtained his doctorate from the University of Chicago, under the supervision of Benson Farb. He was a C. L. E. Moore Instructor at MIT from 2007-2010, and then served on the faculty at Rice from 2010-2016. He then moved to Notre Dame, where he is currently the Notre Dame Professor of Topology.

In 2018, he became a fellow of the American Mathematical Society. In 2014, there was a Seminar Bourbaki talk by Aurélien Djament on Putman's work. Further, in 2013, Putman received the Sloan Research Fellowship and a National Science Foundation CAREER Award.
