= Kathryn Mann =

Mathematician

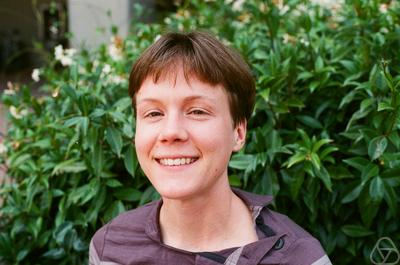
- Mann at UC Berkeley in 2014
- Education: University of Toronto (B.MathPhil); University of Chicago (Ph.D. in Mathematics)
- Occupation: mathematician
- Awards: Rudin Award; Birman Prize; Duszenko Award; Sloan Fellowship

Kathryn Mann is a mathematician who has won the Rudin Award, Birman Prize, Duszenko Award, and Sloan Fellowship for her research in geometric topology and geometric group theory. She is a director of research for the CNRS at the IMJ-PRG in Paris.

== Education and career ==
Mann graduated from the University of Toronto in 2008, with a bachelor's degree in mathematics and philosophy. She completed her Ph.D. in mathematics at the University of Chicago in 2014. Her dissertation, Components of Representation Spaces, was supervised by Benson Farb.

Mann was a Morrey Visiting Assistant Professor and National Science Foundation funded postdoctoral researcher at the University of California, Berkeley from 2014 to 2016, postdoctoral researcher at the Mathematical Sciences Research Institute in 2015, and a visiting professor at Pierre and Marie Curie University in 2016. She was a tenure-track assistant professor at Brown University from 2017 to 2019, then moved to Cornell University in 2019, where she received tenure in 2022. She assumed her current position as a director of research for CNRS in 2026.

== Research ==
Mann's research involves the symmetries of manifolds.

She has made significant progress on a problem posed by Étienne Ghys: when the symmetries of one manifold act nontrivially on a second manifold, must the first manifold have smaller or equal dimension to the second one?^{[H]}

She has also studied the rigidity of groups of symmetries of surfaces.^{[S]}

== Recognition ==
In 2016, Mann won the Mary Ellen Rudin Award for "her deep and extensive work on homeomorphism groups of manifolds". The Association for Women in Mathematics gave Mann their 2019 Joan & Joseph Birman Research Prize in Topology and Geometry, for "major breakthroughs in the theory of dynamics of group actions on manifolds". Also in 2019, the Wrocław Mathematicians Foundation gave Mann the Kamil Duszenko Award.

In 2019, Mann was awarded a National Science Foundation CAREER Award. Also in 2019, she was awarded a Sloan Research Fellowship. In 2022, Cornell named her the Joyce Yelencsics & Frederick Rosevear Faculty Leadership Fellow. She was named as a Fellow of the American Mathematical Society, in its 2027 class of fellows.

== Selected publications ==
H.	Mann, Kathryn (2015), "Homomorphisms between diffeomorphism groups", Ergodic Theory and Dynamical Systems, 35 (1): 192–214, arXiv:1206.1196, doi:10.1017/etds.2013.31, MR 3294298, S2CID 14855914

S.	Mann, Kathryn (2015), "Spaces of surface group representations", Inventiones Mathematicae, 201 (2): 669–710, Bibcode:2015InMat.201..669M, doi:10.1007/s00222-014-0558-4, MR 3370623, S2CID 253745587
