= Elisenda Grigsby =

American mathematician

Julia Elisenda (Eli) Grigsby is an American mathematician who works as a professor at Boston College. Her research began with the study of low-dimensional topology, including knot theory and category-theoretic knot invariants. She is currently working in the field of machine learning.

== Education and career ==
Grigsby earned a bachelor's degree in mathematics from Harvard University in 1999, after earlier forays into biochemistry and physics. After a year working as an operations researcher in Silicon Valley, she returned to graduate school at the University of California, Berkeley, and completed her doctorate in 2005 under the joint supervision of Robion Kirby and Peter Ozsváth.

She was a postdoctoral researcher at Columbia University and the Mathematical Sciences Research Institute, and joined the Boston College faculty in 2009.

== Service ==
Grigsby belongs to the advisory board of Girls' Angle, a non-profit organization for encouraging girls to participate in mathematics, and is responsible for creating a sequence of video lectures by women in mathematics for Girls' Angle.

== Recognition ==
In 2014 she became the inaugural winner of the Joan & Joseph Birman Research Prize in Topology and Geometry, given biennially by the Association for Women in Mathematics to an outstanding early-career female researcher in topology and geometry.
