= Jeanne N. Clelland =

American mathematician

Jeanne A. Nielsen Clelland (born 1970) is an American mathematician specializing in differential geometry and its applications to differential equations. She is a professor of mathematics at the University of Colorado Boulder, and the author of a textbook on moving frames, From Frenet to Cartan: The Method of Moving Frames (Graduate Studies in Mathematics 178, American Mathematical Society, 2017).

== Education ==
Clelland graduated from Duke University in 1991, and stayed at Duke for her graduate studies, completing her doctorate there in 1996. Her dissertation, Geometry of Conservation Laws for a Class of Parabolic Partial Differential Equations, was supervised by Robert Bryant.

== Recognition ==
Clelland was awarded the Alice T. Schafer Prize from the Association for Women in Mathematics in 1991. She is also the 2018 winner of the Burton W. Jones Distinguished Teaching Award, from the Rocky Mountain Section of the Mathematical Association of America.
