= Dan Margalit (mathematician) =

American mathematician

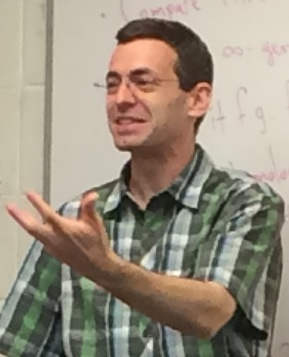
- Born: March 6, 1976 (age 50)
- Education: Brown University (BS); University of Chicago (PhD)
- Scientific career
- Fields: Mathematics
- Workplaces: Vanderbilt University; Georgia Institute of Technology; Tufts University
- Thesis: Algebra versus Topology in Mapping Class Groups (2003)
- Doctoral advisor: Benson Farb

Dan Margalit (born March 6, 1976) is an American mathematician at Vanderbilt University. His research fields include geometric group theory and low-dimensional topology, with a particular focus on mapping class groups of surfaces.

== Education and career ==
Margalit earned his bachelor's degree from Brown University. He earned his doctorate from the University of Chicago in 2003, advised by Benson Farb. His thesis was titled Algebra versus Topology in Mapping Class Groups. Margalit was a postdoctoral scholar at the University of Utah from 2003 to 2008. He was a faculty member at Tufts University from 2008 to 2010, before going to the Georgia Institute of Technology. In 2023, Margalit moved to Vanderbilt University as chair of the Department of Mathematics.

Margalit is known for his work in exposition of geometric group theory, particularly his book with Benson Farb, A Primer on Mapping Class Groups.

== Awards and honors ==
Margalit became a fellow of the American Mathematical Society in 2019; he was recognized "for contributions to low-dimensional topology and geometric group theory, exposition, and mentoring." Margalit was a 2009 Sloan Research Fellow. For 2021 he received the Levi L. Conant Prize of the AMS. For 2024 he was awarded the Leroy P. Steele Prize for Mathematical Exposition.

== Selected publications ==
Books

- Farb, Benson; Margalit, Dan (2011). A Primer on Mapping Class Groups. Princeton University Press. ISBN 978-1-4008-3904-9.
- Clay, Matt; Margalit, Dan (2017). Office Hours with a Geometric Group Theorist. Princeton University Press. ISBN 978-1-4008-8539-8.

Translations

- Fathi, Albert; Laudenbach, François; Poénaru, Valentin (2012). Thurston's Work on Surfaces (translation from French). Translated by Kim, Djun; Margalit, Dan. Princeton University Press. ISBN 978-0-691-14735-2.
