= Robion Kirby =

American mathematician

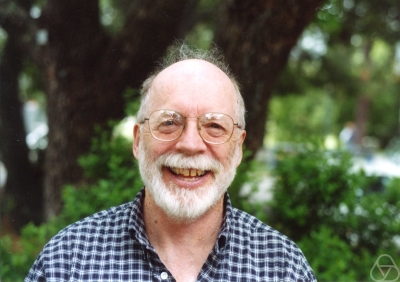
- Kirby in 2009
- Born: February 25, 1938 (age 88); Chicago, Illinois, US
- Education: University of Chicago
- Known for: Kirby–Siebenmann class Kirby calculus
- Awards: Oswald Veblen Prize in Geometry (1971); NAS Award for Scientific Reviewing (1995)
- Scientific career
- Fields: Mathematics
- Workplaces: University of California, Berkeley
- Thesis: Smoothing Locally Flat Imbeddings (1965)
- Doctoral advisor: Eldon Dyer
- Doctoral students: Selman Akbulut; Stephen Bigelow; Tim Cochran; David Gauld; Robert Gompf; Elisenda Grigsby; Tomasz Mrowka; Yongbin Ruan; Martin Scharlemann; Rob Schneiderman; Michael Handel; Charles Livingston

Robion Cromwell Kirby (born February 25, 1938) is a Professor of Mathematics at the University of California, Berkeley who specializes in low-dimensional topology. Together with Laurent C. Siebenmann he developed the Kirby–Siebenmann invariant for classifying the piecewise linear structures on a topological manifold. He also proved the fundamental result on the Kirby calculus, a method for describing 3-manifolds and smooth 4-manifolds by surgery on framed links. Along with his significant mathematical contributions, he has over 50 doctoral students and is the editor of an influential problem list.

== Career ==
He received his Ph.D. from the University of Chicago in 1965, with thesis "Smoothing Locally Flat Imbeddings" written under the direction of Eldon Dyer. He soon became an assistant professor at UCLA. While there he developed his "torus trick" which enabled him to solve, in dimensions greater than four (with additional joint work with Siebenmann), four of John Milnor's seven most important problems in geometric topology.

In 1971, he was awarded the Oswald Veblen Prize in Geometry by the American Mathematical Society.

In 1995 he became the first mathematician to receive the NAS Award for Scientific Reviewing from the National Academy of Sciences for his problem list in low-dimensional topology. He was elected to the National Academy of Sciences in 2001. In 2012 he became a fellow of the American Mathematical Society.

Kirby is also the President of Mathematical Sciences Publishers, a small non-profit academic publishing house that focuses on mathematics and engineering journals.

== Books ==
- Kirby, Robion C.; Siebenmann, Laurence C. (1977). Foundational Essays on Topological Manifolds, Smoothings, and Triangulations (PDF). Annals of Mathematics Studies. Vol. 88. Princeton, NJ: Princeton University Press. ISBN 0-691-08191-3. MR 0645390.
- Kirby, Robion C. (1989). The Topology of 4-Manifolds. Lecture Notes in Mathematics. Vol. 1374. Berlin, New York: Springer-Verlag. doi:10.1007/BFb0089031. ISBN 978-3-540-51148-9. MR 1001966.
