= Efstratia Kalfagianni =

Greek American mathematician

Efstratia (Effie) Kalfagianni is a Greek American mathematician specializing in low-dimensional topology.

== Education and career ==
Kalfagianni graduated from Aristotle University of Thessaloniki in October 1987. After earning a master's degree in 1990 at Fordham University, she moved to Columbia University for doctoral studies, earning a second master's degree in 1991 and completing her Ph.D. in 1995. Her dissertation, Finite Type Invariants for Knots in 3-Manifolds, was supervised by Joan Birman and Xiao-Song Lin.

After postdoctoral study at the Institute for Advanced Study and three years as Hill Assistant Professor at Rutgers University, she moved to Michigan State University in 1998. She was promoted to full professor in 2008 and received the MSU William J. Beal Outstanding Faculty Award in 2019.

== Contributions ==
Kalfagianni has made contributions in knot theory, three-manifolds, hyperbolic geometry, quantum topology and the interplay of these fields. She contributed on the relations of the Jones polynomial to Hyperbolic volumes of knots and on the Volume conjecture for Quantum invariants of 3-manifolds and the theory of Skein modules. With David Futer and Jessica Purcell, Kalfagianni is co-author of the research monograph Guts of Surfaces and the Colored Jones Polynomial (Lecture Notes in Mathematics 2069, Springer, 2013) that derives relations between colored Jones polynomials, the topology of incompressible spanning surfaces in knot and link complements and hyperbolic geometry.

Kalfagianni is an editor for the New York Journal of Mathematics. and an Academic Editor for the Journal of Knot Theory and its Ramifications. She was also one of the editors of the book Interactions Between Hyperbolic Geometry, Quantum Topology and Number Theory (Contemporary Mathematics Volume: 541, AMS, 2011).

Kalfagianni was a member at the Institute for Advanced Study in 1994–1995 in 2004–2005 and in the Fall term of 2019. In 2019 she became a fellow of the American Mathematical Society ``For contributions to knot theory and 3-dimensional topology, and for mentoring" .

== Selected publications ==
- Futer, David; Kalfagianni, Efstratia; Purcell, Jessica (2008), "Dehn filling, volume and the Jones polynomial", Journal of Differential Geometry, 78 (3): 429–464, arXiv:math/0612138, doi:10.4310/jdg/1207834551, MR 2396249
- Detcherry, Renaud; Kalfagianni, Efstratia (2020), "Gromov norm and Turaev-Viro invariants of 3-manifolds", Annales Scientifiques de l'École Normale Supérieure, 53 (6): 1363–1391, arXiv:1705.09964, doi:10.24033/asens.2449, MR 4203040
- Belletti, Giulio; Detcherry, Renaud; Kalfagianni, Efstratia; Yang, Tian (2022), "Growth of quantum $6j$-symbols and applications to the Volume Conjecture", Journal of Differential Geometry, 120 (2): 199–229, arXiv:1807.03327, doi:10.4310/jdg/1645207506, MR 4385116
- Kalfagianni, Efstratia; Ruey Shan Lee, Christine (2023), "Jones diameter and crossing number of knots", Advances in Mathematics, 417 108937, arXiv:2108.12391, doi:10.1016/j.aim.2023.108937, MR 4554670
- Detcherry, Renaud; Kalfagianni, Efstratia; Sikora, Adam (2025), "Kauffman bracket skein modules of small 3-manifolds", Advances in Mathematics, 467 110169, arXiv:2305.16188, doi:10.1016/j.aim.2025.110169, MR 4871425
