= Thurston boundary =

In mathematics, the Thurston boundary of Teichmüller space of a surface is obtained as the boundary of its closure in the projective space of functionals on simple closed curves on the surface. The Thurston boundary can be interpreted as the space of projective measured foliations on the surface.

The Thurston boundary of the Teichmüller space of a closed surface of genus $g$ is homeomorphic to a sphere of dimension $6g-7$. The action of the mapping class group on the Teichmüller space extends continuously over the union with the boundary.

== Measured foliations on surfaces ==
Let $S$ be a closed surface. A measured foliation $(\mathcal F, \mu)$ on $S$ is a foliation $\mathcal F$ on $S$ which may admit isolated singularities, together with a transverse measure $\mu$, i.e. a function which to each arc $\alpha$ transverse to the foliation $\mathcal F$ associates a positive real number $\mu(\alpha)$. The foliation and the measure must be compatible in the sense that the measure is invariant if the arc is deformed with endpoints staying in the same leaf.

Let $\mathcal S$ be the space of isotopy classes of closed simple curves on $S$. A measured foliation $(\mathcal F, \mu)$ can be used to define a function $i((\mathcal F, \mu), \cdot) \in \mathbb R_+^{\mathcal S}$ as follows: if $\gamma$ is any curve let

$$\mu(\gamma) = \sup_{\alpha_1, \ldots, \alpha_r} \left(\sum_{i=1}^r \mu(\alpha_i) \right)$$

where the supremum is taken over all collections of disjoint arcs $\alpha_1\ldots, \alpha_r \subset \gamma$ which are transverse to $\mathcal F$ (in particular $\mu(\gamma) = 0$ if $\gamma$ is a closed leaf of $\mathcal F$). Then if $\sigma \in \mathcal S$ the intersection number is defined by:

$$i \bigl((\mathcal F, \mu), \sigma \bigr) = \inf_{\gamma \in \sigma} \mu(\gamma)$$.

Two measured foliations are said to be equivalent if they define the same function on $\mathcal S$ (there is a topological criterion for this equivalence via Whitehead moves). The space $\mathcal{PMF}$ of projective measured foliations is the image of the set of measured foliations in the projective space $\mathbb P(\mathbb R_+^{\mathcal S})$ via the embedding $i$. If the genus $g$ of $S$ is at least 2, the space $\mathcal{PMF}$ is homeomorphic to the $6g-7$-dimensional sphere (in the case of the torus it is the 2-sphere; there are no measured foliations on the sphere).

== Compactification of Teichmüller space ==
=== Embedding in the space of functionals ===
Let $S$ be a closed surface. Recall that a point in the Teichmüller space is a pair $(X, f)$ where $X$ is a hyperbolic surface (a Riemannian manifold with sectional curvatures all equal to $-1$) and $f$ a homeomorphism, up to a natural equivalence relation. The Teichmüller space can be realised as a space of functionals on the set $\mathcal S$ of isotopy classes of simple closed curves on $\mathcal S$ as follows. If $x = (X, f) \in T(S)$ and $\sigma \in \mathcal S$ then $\ell(x, \sigma)$ is defined to be the length of the unique closed geodesic on $X$ in the isotopy class $f_*\sigma$. The map $x \mapsto \ell(x, \cdot)$ is an embedding of $T(S)$ into $\mathbb R_+^{\mathcal S}$, which can be used to give the Teichmüller space a topology (the right-hand side being given the product topology).

In fact, the map to the projective space $\mathbb P(\mathbb R_+^{\mathcal S})$ is still an embedding: let $\mathcal T$ denote the image of $T(S)$ there. Since this space is compact, the closure $\overline \mathcal T$ is compact: it is called the Thurston compactification of the Teichmüller space.

=== The Thurston boundary ===
The boundary $\overline \mathcal T \setminus \mathcal T$ is equal to the subset $\mathcal{PMF}$ of $\mathbb P(\mathbb R_+^{\mathcal S})$. The proof also implies that the Thurston compactification is homeomorphic to the $6g - 6$-dimensional closed ball.

== Applications ==
=== Pseudo-Anosov diffeomorphisms ===
A diffeomorphism $S \to S$ is called pseudo-Anosov if there exists two transverse measured foliations, such that under its action the underlying foliations are preserved, and the measures are multiplied by a factor $\lambda, \lambda^{-1}$ respectively for some $\lambda > 1$ (called the stretch factor). Using his compactification Thurston proved the following characterisation of pseudo-Anosov mapping classes (i.e. mapping classes which contain a pseudo-Anosov element), which was in essence known to Nielsen and is usually called the Nielsen-Thurston classification. A mapping class $\phi$ is pseudo-Anosov if and only if:

- it is not reducible (i.e. there is no $k \ge 1$ and $\sigma \in \mathcal S$ such that $(\phi^k)_*\sigma = \sigma$);
- it is not of finite order (i.e. there is no $k \ge 1$ such that $\phi^k$ is the isotopy class of the identity).

The proof relies on the Brouwer fixed point theorem applied to the action of $\phi$ on the Thurston compactification $\overline \mathcal T$. If the fixed point is in the interior then the class is of finite order; if it is on the boundary and the underlying foliation has a closed leaf then it is reducible; in the remaining case it is possible to show that there is another fixed point corresponding to a transverse measured foliation, and to deduce the pseudo-Anosov property.

=== Applications to the mapping class group ===
The action of the mapping class group of the surface $S$ on the Teichmüller space extends continuously to the Thurston compactification. This provides a powerful tool to study the structure of this group; for example it is used in the proof of the Tits alternative for the mapping class group. It can also be used to prove various results about the subgroup structure of the mapping class group.

=== Applications to 3–manifolds ===
The compactification of Teichmüller space by adding measured foliations is essential in the definition of the ending laminations of a hyperbolic 3-manifold.

== Actions on real trees ==
A point in Teichmüller space $T(S)$ can alternatively be seen as a faithful representation of the fundamental group $\pi_1(S)$ into the isometry group $\mathrm{PSL}_2(\mathbb R)$ of the hyperbolic plane $\mathbb H^2$, up to conjugation. Such an isometric action gives rise (via the choice of a non-principal ultrafilter) to an action on the asymptotic cone of $\mathbb H^2$, which is a real tree. Two such actions are equivariantly isometric if and only if they come from the same point in Teichmüller space. The space of such actions (endowed with a natural topology) is compact, and hence we get another compactification of Teichmüller space. A theorem of R. Skora states that this compactification is equivariantly homeomorphic the Thurston compactification.
