= Peter Ozsváth =

American mathematician

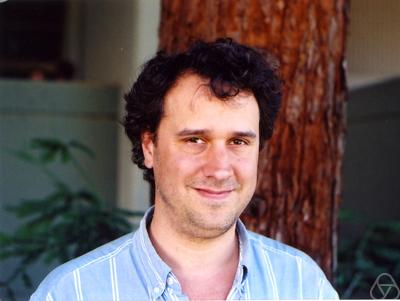
- Ozsváth in Berkeley, 2005
- Born: 20 October 1967 (age 59); Dallas, Texas. United States
- Education: Princeton University
- Awards: Oswald Veblen Prize in Geometry (2007); Guggenheim Fellow (2008); Member of the National Academy of Sciences (2018)
- Scientific career
- Fields: Mathematics
- Workplaces: Princeton University; Massachusetts Institute of Technology; Columbia University; Yale University; University of California, Berkeley
- Doctoral advisor: John Morgan
- Doctoral students: Elisenda Grigsby; Kristen Hendricks

Peter Steven Ozsváth (born October 20, 1967) is a professor of mathematics at Princeton University. He created, along with Zoltán Szabó, Heegaard Floer homology, a homology theory for 3-manifolds.

== Education ==
Ozsváth received his PhD from Princeton in 1994 under the supervision of John Morgan; his dissertation was entitled On Blowup Formulas For SU(2) Donaldson Polynomials.

== Awards ==
In 2007, Ozsváth was one of the recipients of the Oswald Veblen Prize in Geometry. In 2008 he was named a Guggenheim Fellow. In July 2017, he was a plenary lecturer in the Mathematical Congress of the Americas. He was elected a member of the National Academy of Sciences in 2018. He was elected to the 2026 class of Fellows of the American Mathematical Society.

== Selected publications ==
- Ozsváth, Peter; Szabó, Zoltán (2004). "Holomorphic disks and topological invariants for closed three-manifolds". Ann. of Math. 159 (3): 1027–1158. arXiv:math/0101206. doi:10.4007/annals.2004.159.1027. S2CID 119143219.
- Ozsváth, Peter; Szabó, Zoltán (2004). "Holomorphic disks and three-manifold invariants: properties and applications". Ann. of Math. 159 (3): 1159–1245. arXiv:math/0105202. doi:10.4007/annals.2004.159.1159.
- Grid Homology for Knots and Links, American Math Society, (2015)
