= Markov theorem =

Gives necessary and sufficient conditions for two braids to have equivalent closures

Braid closure

In mathematics the Markov theorem gives necessary and sufficient conditions for two braids to have closures that are equivalent knots or links. The conditions are stated in terms of the group structures on braids.

Braids are algebraic objects described by diagrams; the relation to topology is given by Alexander's theorem which states that every knot or link in three-dimensional Euclidean space is the closure of a braid. The Markov theorem, proved by Russian mathematician Andrei Andreevich Markov Jr. describes the elementary moves generating the equivalence relation on braids given by the equivalence of their closures.

More precisely Markov's theorem can be stated as follows: given two braids represented by elements $\beta_n, \beta_m'$ in the braid groups $B_n, B_m$, their closures are equivalent links if and only if $\beta_m'$ can be obtained from applying to $\beta_n$ a sequence of the following operations:

1. conjugating $\beta_n$ in $B_n$;
2. replacing $\beta_n$ by $\beta_n\sigma_{n}^{\pm 1} \in B_{n+1}$ (here $\sigma_i$ are the standard generators of the braid groups; geometrically this amounts to adding a strand to the right of the braid diagram and twisting it once with the (previously) last strand);
3. the inverse of the previous operation (if $\beta_n = \beta_{n-1}\sigma_{n-1}^{\pm 1}$ with $\beta_{n-1} \in B_{n-1}$ replace with $\beta_{n-1}$).

In 1974 American mathematician Joan Birman published a monograph, Braids, Links, and Mapping Class Groups, based on a graduate course she taught as a visiting professor at Princeton University in 1971–72; this book contains the first complete proof of the Markov theorem.
