= Kristen Hendricks =

American mathematician

Kristen Hendricks is an American mathematician specializing in low-dimensional topology, including work on involutive Heegaard Floer homology and equivariant Floer homology. She is a professor of mathematics at Rutgers University.

== Education and career ==
Hendricks graduated magna cum laude from Harvard College in 2008, with an undergraduate thesis on Morse theory and the Bott periodicity theorem mentored by Véronique Godin. She completed a Ph.D. in mathematics at Columbia University in 2013, jointly advised by Robert Lipshitz and Peter Ozsváth. Her dissertation was Localization and Heegaard Floer Homology.

After postdoctoral research at the University of California, Los Angeles as an E. R. Hedrick Assistant Adjunct Professor, she became an assistant professor at Michigan State University in 2016, moved to Rutgers University in 2019, and was promoted to associate professor in 2021 and full professor in 2026.

== Recognition ==
Hendricks was the 2023 winner of the Joan & Joseph Birman Research Prize in Topology and Geometry, given to her "for highly influential work on equivariant aspects of Floer homology theories".
