= Jessica Purcell =

American mathematician

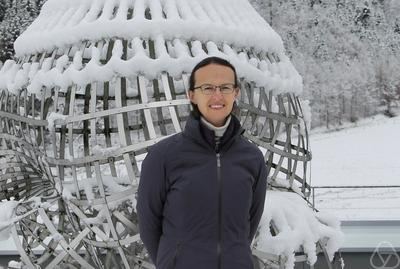
Purcell at Oberwolfach in 2023

Jessica A. Shepherd Purcell is an American mathematician specializing in low-dimensional topology whose research topics have included hyperbolic Dehn surgery and the Jones polynomial. She is a professor of mathematics at Monash University in Melbourne, Australia.

== Education ==
Purcell credits a high school mathematics teacher, Mr. Pehrson, for her interest in mathematics. She majored in mathematics as an undergraduate at the University of Utah, with a minor in computer science. She was a co-winner of the 1998 Alice T. Schafer Prize for Excellence in Mathematics by an Undergraduate Woman of the Association for Women in Mathematics, and graduated summa cum laude in 1998.

After earning a master's degree in mathematics at the University of Michigan in 1999, Purcell completed her Ph.D. at Stanford University in 2004. Her dissertation, Cusp Shapes of Hyperbolic Link Complements and Dehn Filling, was supervised by Steven Kerckhoff.

== Career ==
After postdoctoral research at the University of Texas at Austin and University of Oxford, Purcell became an assistant professor at Brigham Young University in 2007. She was named a Sloan Research Fellow in 2011, and earned tenure at Brigham Young in 2013. After visits to Monash University and at the Institute for Advanced Study as a Von Neumann Fellow, she moved to Monash as an associate professor in 2015, became an ARC Future Fellow in 2017, and was named full professor in 2019.

She chaired the Women in Mathematics Special Interest Group of the Australian Mathematical Society for 2018–2019 and 2019–2020.

== Recognition ==
Purcell's work has earned international recognition for advancing understanding of geometric structures in three-dimensional spaces, including applications to theoretical physics and pure mathematics. She has received prestigious awards, such as the Alfred P. Sloan Research Fellowship in 2011, the National Science Foundation CAREER Award from 2013 to 2016, and the Von Neumann Fellowship at the Institute for Advanced Study in 2015. Purcell was elected a Fellow of the Australian Academy of Science in May 2025. She was elected to the 2026 class of Fellows of the American Mathematical Society.

== Books ==
Purcell is the author of the book Hyperbolic Knot Theory (Graduate Studies in Mathematics 209, American Mathematical Society, 2020). With David Futer and Efstratia Kalfagianni she is a coauthor of Guts of Surfaces and the Colored Jones Polynomial (Lecture Notes in Mathematics 2069, Springer, 2012).
