= Annulus theorem =

In mathematics, on the region between two well-behaved spheres

In mathematics, the annulus theorem (formerly called the annulus conjecture) states roughly that the region between two well-behaved spheres is an annulus. It is closely related to the stable homeomorphism conjecture (now proved) which states that every orientation-preserving homeomorphism of Euclidean space is stable.

== Statement ==
If S and T are topological spheres in Euclidean space, with S contained in T, then it is not true in general that the region between them is an annulus, because of the existence of wild spheres in dimension at least 3. So the annulus theorem has to be stated to exclude these examples, by adding some condition to ensure that S and T are well behaved. There are several ways to do this.

The annulus theorem states that if any homeomorphism h of R^{n} to itself maps the unit ball B into its interior, then B − h(interior(B)) is homeomorphic to the annulus S^{n−1}×[0,1].

== History of proof ==
The annulus theorem is trivial in dimensions 0 and 1. It was proved in dimension 2 by Radó (1924), in dimension 3 by Moise (1952), in dimension 4 by Quinn (1982), and in dimensions at least 5 by Kirby (1969).

=== Torus trick ===
Robion Kirby's torus trick is a proof method employing an immersion of a punctured torus $\mathbb{T}^{n} - \mathbb{D}^{n}$ into $\mathbb{R}^{n}$, where then smooth structures can be pulled back along the immersion and be lifted to covers. The torus trick is used in Kirby's proof of the annulus theorem in dimensions $n \ge 5$. It was also employed in further investigations of topological manifolds with Laurent C. Siebenmann

Here is a list of some further applications of the torus trick that appeared in the literature:

- Proving existence and uniqueness (up to isotopy) of smooth structures on surfaces
- Proving existence and uniqueness (up to isotopy) of PL structures on 3-manifolds

== The stable homeomorphism conjecture ==
A homeomorphism of R^{n} is called stable if it is the composite of (a finite family of) homeomorphisms each of which is the identity on some non-empty open set.

The stable homeomorphism conjecture states that every orientation-preserving homeomorphism of R^{n} is stable. Brown & Gluck (1964) previously showed that the stable homeomorphism conjecture is equivalent to the annulus conjecture, so it is true.
