= Jing-Rebecca Li =

Applied mathematician

Jing-Rebecca Li is an applied mathematician known for her work on magnetic resonance imaging and Lyapunov equations. She is a researcher with the French Institute for Research in Computer Science and Automation (INRIA), at their Saclay research center.

== Education and career ==
Li graduated from the University of Michigan in 1995 with highest distinction and honors in mathematics, after starting out at Michigan as a mechanical engineering student. She completed a Ph.D. in applied mathematics at the Massachusetts Institute of Technology in 2000. Her dissertation, Model reduction of large linear systems via low rank system Gramians, was supervised by Jacob K. White.

She was a postdoctoral researcher at the Courant Institute of Mathematical Sciences from 2000 to 2003, and earned a habilitation at Paris-Sud University in 2013. She has been a research scientist with INRIA since 2003.

== Recognition ==
As an undergraduate, Li won the 1994 Alice T. Schafer Prize for Excellence in Mathematics by an Undergraduate Women, given by the Association for Women in Mathematics.

In 2001, Li was one of the second prize winners of the Leslie Fox Prize for Numerical Analysis. Li won the Alston S. Householder Prize, a triennial award for the best dissertation in numerical linear algebra, in 2002.

A 2002 paper of Li, "Low-rank solution of Lyapunov equations" (with Jacob White) was selected in 2004 by SIAM Review for their "SIGEST" collection of papers "chosen on the basis of exceptional interest to the entire SIAM community".
