= Benson Farb =

American mathematician (born 1967)

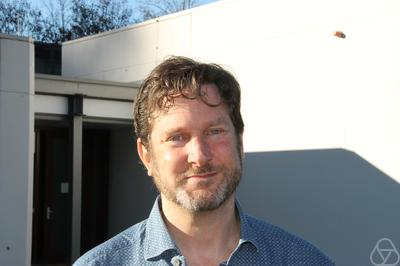
- Farb at Oberwolfach, 2016
- Born: October 25, 1967 (age 58)
- Education: Cornell University; Princeton University
- Spouse: Amie Wilkinson (m. 1996)
- Scientific career
- Fields: Mathematics
- Workplaces: University of Chicago
- Thesis: Relatively Hyperbolic And Automatic Groups With Applications To Negatively Curved Manifolds (1994)
- Doctoral advisor: William Thurston
- Doctoral students: Pallavi Dani; Kathryn Mann; Dan Margalit; Karin Melnick; Andrew Putman; Jennifer Taback

Benson Stanley Farb (born October 25, 1967) is an American mathematician at the University of Chicago. His research fields include geometric group theory and low-dimensional topology.

== Early life ==
A native of Norristown, Pennsylvania, Farb earned his bachelor's degree from Cornell University. In 1994, he obtained his doctorate from Princeton University, under the supervision of William Thurston.

== Career ==
Farb has advised over 40 students, including Pallavi Dani, Kathryn Mann, Dan Margalit, Karin Melnick and Andrew Putman.

In 2012, Farb became a fellow of the American Mathematical Society. In 2014, he was an invited speaker at the International Congress of Mathematicians in Seoul, speaking in the section on Topology. He was elected to the American Academy of Arts and Sciences in 2021. In 2024, he was awarded the Leroy P. Steele Prize for Mathematical Exposition.

== Books ==
- Benson Farb; Dan Margalit (2012). A Primer on Mapping Class Groups. Princeton University Press. ISBN 978-0-691-14794-9. MR 2850125.
- Farb, Benson; Dennis, R. Keith (1993). Noncommutative Algebra. Springer-Verlag. ISBN 978-1-4612-0889-1. MR 1233388.

== Personal life ==
Farb married Amie Wilkinson, professor of mathematics at the University of Chicago, on December 28, 1996. They are professors in the same department.
