= Burau representation =

Mathematical representation

In mathematics the Burau representation is a representation of the braid groups, named after and originally studied by the German mathematician Werner Burau during the 1930s. The Burau representation has two common and near-equivalent formulations, the reduced and unreduced Burau representations.

== Definition ==
The covering space C_{n} may be thought of concretely as follows: cut the disk along lines from the boundary to the marked points. Take as many copies of the result as there are integers, stack them vertically, and connect them by ramps going from one side of the cut on one level to the other side of the cut on the level below. This procedure is shown here for n = 4; the covering transformations t^{±1} act by shifting the space vertically.

Consider the braid group B_{n} to be the mapping class group of a disc with n marked points D_{n}. The homology group H_{1}(D_{n}) is free abelian of rank n. Moreover, the invariant subspace of H_{1}(D_{n}) (under the action of B_{n}) is primitive and infinite cyclic. Let π : H_{1}(D_{n}) → Z be the projection onto this invariant subspace. Then there is a covering space C_{n} corresponding to this projection map. Much as in the construction of the Alexander polynomial, consider H_{1}(C_{n}) as a module over the group-ring of covering transformations Z[Z], which is isomorphic to the ring of Laurent polynomials Z[t, t^{−1}]. As a Z[t, t^{−1}]-module, H_{1}(C_{n}) is free of rank n − 1. By the basic theory of covering spaces, B_{n} acts on H_{1}(C_{n}), and this representation is called the reduced Burau representation.

The unreduced Burau representation has a similar definition, namely one replaces D_{n} with its (real, oriented) blow-up at the marked points. Then instead of considering H_{1}(C_{n}) one considers the relative homology H_{1}(C_{n}, Γ) where γ ⊂ D_{n} is the part of the boundary of D_{n} corresponding to the blow-up operation together with one point on the disc's boundary. Γ denotes the lift of γ to C_{n}. As a Z[t, t^{−1}]-module this is free of rank n.

By the homology long exact sequence of a pair, the Burau representations fit into a short exact sequence

0 → V_{r} → V_{u} → D ⊕ Z[t, t^{−1}] → 0,

where V_{r} (resp. V_{u}) is the reduced (resp. unreduced) Burau B_{n}-module and D ⊂ Z^{n} is the complement to the diagonal subspace, in other words:

$$D = \left \{ \left (x_1,\cdots,x_n \right ) \in \mathbf{Z}^n : x_1+\cdots+x_n=0 \right \},$$

and B_{n} acts on Z^{n} by the permutation representation.

== Explicit matrices ==
Let σ_{i} denote the standard generators of the braid group B_{n}. Then the unreduced Burau representation may be given explicitly by mapping

$$\sigma_i \mapsto \left( \begin{array}{c|cc|c} I_{i-1} & 0 & 0 & 0 \\ \hline 0 & 1-t & t & 0 \\ 0 & 1 & 0 & 0 \\ \hline 0 & 0 & 0 & I_{n-i-1} \end{array} \right),$$

for 1 ≤ i ≤ n − 1, where I_{k} denotes the k × k identity matrix. Likewise, for n ≥ 3 the reduced Burau representation is given by

$$\begin{align}
\sigma_1 &\mapsto \left( \begin{array}{cc|c}-t & 1 & 0 \\ 0 & 1 & 0 \\ \hline 0 & 0 & I_{n-3} \end{array} \right), \\[3pt]
\sigma_i &\mapsto \left( \begin{array}{c|ccc|c} I_{i-2} & 0 & 0 & 0 & 0 \\ \hline 0 & 1 & 0 & 0 & 0 \\ 0 & t & -t & 1 & 0 \\ 0 & 0 & 0 & 1 & 0 \\ \hline 0 & 0 & 0 & 0 & I_{n-i-2} \end{array} \right), \quad 2 \leq i \leq n-2, \\[3pt]
\sigma_{n-1} &\mapsto \left( \begin{array}{c|cc} I_{n-3} & 0 & 0 \\ \hline 0 & 1 & 0 \\ 0 & t & -t \end{array} \right),
\end{align}$$
while for n = 2, it maps
$$\sigma_1 \mapsto \left( -t \right).$$

=== Bowling alley interpretation ===
Vaughan Jones gave the following interpretation of the unreduced Burau representation of positive braids for t in [0,1] – i.e. for braids that are words in the standard braid group generators containing no inverses – which follows immediately from the above explicit description:

Given a positive braid σ on n strands, interpret it as a bowling alley with n intertwining lanes. Now throw a bowling ball down one of the lanes and assume that at every crossing where its path crosses over another lane, it falls down with probability t and continues along the lower lane. Then the (i,j)'th entry of the unreduced Burau representation of σ is the probability that a ball thrown into the i'th lane ends up in the j'th lane.

== Relation to the Alexander polynomial ==
If a knot K is the closure of a braid f in B_{n}, then, up to multiplication by a unit in Z[t, t^{−1}], the Alexander polynomial Δ_{K}(t) of K is given by

$$\frac{1-t}{1-t^n} \det(I-f_*),$$

where f_{∗} is the reduced Burau representation of the braid f.

For example, if f = σ_{1}σ_{2} in B_{3}, one finds by using the explicit matrices above that

$$\frac{1-t}{1-t^n} \det(I-f_*) = 1,$$

and the closure of f_{*} is the unknot whose Alexander polynomial is 1.

== Faithfulness ==
The first nonfaithful Burau representations were found by John A. Moody without the use of computer, using a notion of winding number or contour integration. A more conceptual understanding, due to Darren D. Long and Mark Paton interprets the linking or winding as coming from Poincaré duality in first homology relative to the basepoint of a covering space, and uses the intersection form (traditionally called Squier's Form as Craig Squier was the first to explore its properties). Stephen Bigelow combined computer techniques and the Long–Paton theorem to show that the Burau representation is not faithful for n ≥ 5. Bigelow moreover provides an explicit non-trivial element in the kernel as a word in the standard generators of the braid group: let

$$\psi_1 = \sigma_3^{-1}\sigma_2 \sigma_1^2 \sigma_2 \sigma_4^3 \sigma_3 \sigma_2, \quad \psi_2 = \sigma_4^{-1} \sigma_3 \sigma_2 \sigma_1^{-2} \sigma_2 \sigma_1^2 \sigma_2^2 \sigma_1 \sigma_4^5.$$

Then an element of the kernel is given by the commutator

$$[\psi_1^{-1}\sigma_4\psi_1,\psi_2^{-1}\sigma_4\sigma_3\sigma_2\sigma_1^2\sigma_2\sigma_3\sigma_4\psi_2].$$

The Burau representation for n = 2 has been known to be faithful for some time, as the braid group is infinite cyclic. The n = 3 case was shown to be faithful by Magnus–Peluso in 1969.

The faithfulness of the Burau representation when n = 4 is a longstanding open problem. In 2026 Vasudha Bharathram, Joan Birman, and Tara E. Brendle posted a preprint on arXiv claiming to prove faithfulness for n = 4. However, as noted by the New York Times, this claim has not yet been verified by the mathematical community and errors may be uncovered in the refereeing process. The claim attracted swift media attention primarily due to Birman's age and the significance of the problem whose solution was claimed.

The Burau representation appears as a summand of the Jones representation, and for n = 4, the faithfulness of the Burau representation is equivalent to that of the Jones representation, which on the other hand is related to the question of whether or not the Jones polynomial is an unknot detector.

== Geometry ==
Craig Squier showed that the Burau representation preserves a sesquilinear form. Moreover, when the variable t is chosen to be a transcendental unit complex number near 1, it is a positive-definite Hermitian pairing. Thus the Burau representation of the braid group B_{n} can be thought of as a map into the unitary group U(n).
