= Kirby calculus =

Describes how distinct surgery presentations of a given 3-manifold are related

In mathematics, the Kirby calculus in geometric topology, named after Robion Kirby, is a method for modifying framed links in the 3-sphere using a finite set of moves, the Kirby moves. Using four-dimensional Cerf theory, he proved that if M and N are 3-manifolds, resulting from Dehn surgery on framed links L and J respectively, then they are homeomorphic if and only if L and J are related by a sequence of Kirby moves. According to the Lickorish–Wallace theorem any closed orientable 3-manifold is obtained by such surgery on some link in the 3-sphere.

Some ambiguity exists in the literature on the precise use of the term "Kirby moves". Different presentations of "Kirby calculus" have a different set of moves and these are sometimes called Kirby moves. Kirby's original formulation involved two kinds of move, the "blow-up" and the "handle slide"; Roger Fenn and Colin Rourke exhibited an equivalent construction in terms of a single move, the Fenn–Rourke move, that appears in many expositions and extensions of the Kirby calculus. Dale Rolfsen's book, Knots and Links, from which many topologists have learned the Kirby calculus, describes a set of two moves: 1) delete or add a component with surgery coefficient infinity 2) twist along an unknotted component and modify surgery coefficients appropriately (this is called the Rolfsen twist). This allows an extension of the Kirby calculus to rational surgeries.

There are also various tricks to modify surgery diagrams. One such useful move is the slam-dunk.

An extended set of diagrams and moves are used for describing 4-manifolds. A framed link in the 3-sphere encodes instructions for attaching 2-handles to the 4-ball. (The 3-dimensional boundary of this manifold is the 3-manifold interpretation of the link diagram mentioned above.) 1-handles are denoted by either

1. a pair of 3-balls (the attaching region of the 1-handle) or, more commonly,
2. unknotted circles with dots.

The dot indicates that a neighborhood of a standard 2-disk with boundary the dotted circle is to be excised from the interior of the 4-ball. Excising this 2-handle is equivalent to adding a 1-handle; 3-handles and 4-handles are usually not indicated in the diagram.

== Handle decomposition ==
- A closed, smooth 4-manifold is usually described by a handle decomposition.
- A 0-handle is just a ball, and the attaching map is disjoint union.
- A 1-handle is attached along two disjoint 3-balls.
- A 2-handle is attached along a solid torus; since this solid torus is embedded in a 3-manifold, there is a relation between handle decompositions on 4-manifolds, and knot theory in 3-manifolds.
- A pair of handles with index differing by 1, whose cores link each other in a sufficiently simple way can be cancelled without changing the underlying manifold. Similarly, such a cancelling pair can be created.

Two different smooth handlebody decompositions of a smooth 4-manifold are related by a finite sequence of isotopies of the attaching maps, and the creation/cancellation of handle pairs.

== See also ==
- Exotic $\R^4$
