= Alexander's theorem =

Every knot or link can be represented as a closed braid

This is a typical element of the braid group, which is used in the mathematical field of knot theory.

In mathematics Alexander's theorem states that every knot or link can be represented as a closed braid; that is, a braid in which the corresponding ends of the strings are connected in pairs. The theorem is named after James Waddell Alexander II, who published a proof in 1923.

Braids were first considered as a tool of knot theory by Alexander. His theorem gives a positive answer to the question Is it always possible to transform a given knot into a closed braid? A good construction example is found in Colin Adams's book.

However, the correspondence between knots and braids is clearly not one-to-one: a knot may have many braid representations. For example, conjugate braids yield equivalent knots. This leads to a second fundamental question: Which closed braids represent the same knot type? This question is addressed in Markov's theorem, which gives ‘moves’ relating any two closed braids that represent the same knot.
