= Alice T. Schafer Prize =

Award for mathematics

Alice T. Schafer Mathematics Prize
- Description: Annual award presented to an undergraduate woman for excellence in mathematics
- Country: United States
- Presented by: Association for Women in Mathematics

The Alice T. Schafer Mathematics Prize is given annually to an undergraduate woman for excellence in mathematics by the Association for Women in Mathematics (AWM). The prize, which carries a monetary award, is named for former AWM president and founding member Alice T. Schafer; it was first awarded in 1990.

== Recipients ==
The recipients of the Alice T. Schafer Mathematics Prize are:

- 1990: Linda Green, Elizabeth Wilmer
- 1991: Jeanne Nielsen Clelland
- 1992: Zvezdelina E. Stankova
- 1993: Catherine O'Neil, Dana Pascovici
- 1994: Jing-Rebecca Li
- 1995: Ruth Britto-Pacumio
- 1996: Ioana Dumitriu
- 1997: No prize awarded (due to calendar change)
- 1998: Sharon Ann Lozano, Jessica A. Shepherd
- 1999: Caroline Klivans
- 2000: Mariana E. Campbell
- 2001: Jaclyn (Kohles) Anderson
- 2002: Kay Kirkpatrick, Melanie Wood
- 2003: Kate Gruher
- 2004: Kimberly Spears
- 2005: Melody Chan
- 2006: Alexandra Ovetsky
- 2007: Ana Caraiani
- 2008: Galyna Dobrovolska, Alison Miller
- 2009: Maria Monks
- 2010: Hannah Alpert, Charmaine Sia
- 2011: Sherry Gong
- 2012: Fan Wei
- 2013: MurphyKate Montee
- 2014: Sarah Peluse
- 2015: Sheela Devadas
- 2016: Mackenzie Simper
- 2017: Hannah Larson
- 2018: Libby Taylor
- 2019: Naomi Sweeting
- 2020: Natalia Pacheco-Tallaj
- 2021: Elena Kim
- 2022: Carina Hong
- 2023: Faye Jackson
- 2024: Zoë Batterman, Arianna Meenakshi McNamara
- 2025: Tahda Queer, Marie-Hélène Tomé, Katherine Tung
- 2026: Khyathi Komalan, Chloe Marple, Saskia Solotko

== See also ==
- List of mathematics awards
