= Jennifer Taback =

American mathematician

Jennifer Taback is an American mathematician whose research focuses on geometric group theory and combinatorial group theory. She is the Isaac Henry Wing Professor of Mathematics and Chair of the Mathematics Department at Bowdoin College in Maine.

== Education and career ==
After earning a bachelor's degree in mathematics at Yale University in 1993, Taback went to the University of Chicago for graduate study in mathematics, earning a master's degree in 1994 and completing her Ph.D. in 1998. Her 1998 doctoral dissertation, Quasi-Isometric Rigity for $PSL_2\bigl(\mathbb{Z}[\tfrac1p]\bigr)$, was supervised by Benson Farb.

After a postdoctoral stay at the University of California, Berkeley as Charles B. Morrey assistant professor, she became an assistant professor of mathematics at the University at Albany in 1999, moving to her present position at Bowdoin in 2004. She was tenured as an associate professor in 2007, and promoted to full professor in 2012.

She was appointed to the Isaac Henry Wing Professorship in 2021; the professorship was endowed in 1906 by a former Bowdoin student.

== Recognition ==
Taback was elected to the 2026 class of Fellows of the American Mathematical Society.
