= Joseph L. Birman =

American physicist (1927–2016)

Joseph Leon Birman
- Born: May 21, 1927; New York City, U.S.
- Died: October 1, 2016 (aged 89); New Rochelle, New York, U.S.
- Education: Bronx High School of Science; City College of New York; Columbia University
- Occupation: theoretical solid-state physicist
- Spouse: Joan Sylvia Lyttle Birman
- Children: 2 sons 1 daughter

Joseph Leon Birman (May 21, 1927 in New York City – October 1, 2016 in New Rochelle) was an American theoretical solid-state physicist.

== Life ==
Birman was the son of a salesman. He went to the Bronx High School of Science (graduated in 1943) then studied at City College of New York, graduating with a bachelor's degree in 1947. He next attended Columbia University, gaining a master's degree in 1950 and a PhD in theoretical chemistry in 1952. He then spent about ten years at an electronics and telecommunications research lab (later GTE Research Labs in Queens) in New York where he studied the optical properties of semiconductors. From 1962 he was a professor at New York University and from 1974 professor at the City College of New York. Most recently, he was distinguished professor at CUNY.

From 1969 to 1970 he was a guest professor in Paris. In 1974 he received an honorary doctorate from the University of Rennes. He was a Guggenheim Fellow, Lady Davis Fellow at the Technion in Haifa, and was a Fellow of the American Physical Society, the Japan Society for the Promotion of Science, and the New York Academy of Sciences.

Birman organized symposia in the 1970s between American and Soviet scientists in Moscow, New York and St. Petersburg. In particular, he mostly supported Jewish scholars in the Soviet Union, who were denied exit (Birman himself was the grandson of Jewish grandparents who emigrated from Russia). In the 1990s he organized a support program with Pierre Hohenberg for scientists who had emigrated to the United States, especially from Eastern Europe and China. In 2010, he received the Andrei Sakharov Prize of the American Physical Society, of whose Human Rights Committee he was a member of. In 2006, he received the Heinz R. Pagels Human Rights of Scientists Award from the New York Academy of Sciences.

In 1950 he married the mathematician Joan Birman. They had two sons and a daughter.

== Works ==
- Theory of Crystal Space Groups and Lattice Dynamics: Infrared and Raman Optical Process in Insulating Crystals. In: Handbuch der Physik. 1974, doi:10.1007/978-3-642-69707-4 1
