= Configuration space (mathematics) =

Concept in mathematics

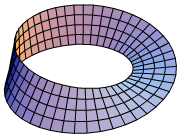
The configuration space of all unordered pairs of points on the circle is the Möbius strip.

In mathematics, a configuration space is a construction closely related to state spaces or phase spaces in physics. In physics, these are used to describe the state of a whole system as a single point in a high-dimensional space. In mathematics, they are used to describe assignments of a collection of points to positions in a topological space. More specifically, configuration spaces in mathematics are particular examples of configuration spaces in physics in the particular case of several non-colliding particles.

== Definition ==
For a topological space $X$ and a positive integer $n$, let $X^n$ be the Cartesian product of $n$ copies of $X$, equipped with the product topology. The n^{th} (ordered) configuration space of $X$ is the set of n-tuples of pairwise distinct points in $X$:

$\operatorname{Conf}_n(X) := X^n \smallsetminus \{(x_1,x_2,\ldots,x_n)\in X^n \mid x_i= x_j\ \text{for some }i\neq j\}.$

This space is generally endowed with the subspace topology from the inclusion of $\operatorname{Conf}_n(X)$ into $X^n$. It is also sometimes denoted $F(X, n)$, $F^n(X)$, or $\mathcal{C}^n(X)$.

There is a natural action of the symmetric group $S_n$ on the points in $\operatorname{Conf}_n(X)$ given by

$$\begin{align}
S_n\times \operatorname{Conf}_n(X)&\longrightarrow \operatorname{Conf}_n(X) \\
(\sigma,x)&\longmapsto \sigma(x)=(x_{\sigma(1)},x_{\sigma(2)},\ldots,x_{\sigma(n)}).
\end{align}$$

This action gives rise to the n^{th} unordered configuration space of X,

$$\operatorname{UConf}_n(X) := \operatorname{Conf}_n(X)/S_n,$$

which is the orbit space of that action. The intuition is that this action "forgets the names of the points". The unordered configuration space is sometimes denoted $\mathcal{UC}^n(X)$, $B_n(X)$, or $C_n(X)$. The collection of unordered configuration spaces over all $n$ is the Ran space, and comes with a natural topology.

=== Alternative formulations ===
For a topological space $X$ and a finite set $S$, the configuration space of X with particles labeled by S is

$$\operatorname{Conf}_S(X) := \{f\mid f\colon S\hookrightarrow X\text{ is injective}\}.$$

For $n\in\N$, define $\mathbf{n}:=\{1,2,\ldots,n\}$. Then the n^{th} configuration space of X is denoted simply $\operatorname{Conf}_n(X)$.

== Examples ==
- The space of ordered configuration of two points in $\mathbf{R}^2$ is homeomorphic to the product of the Euclidean 3-space with a circle, i.e. $\operatorname{Conf}_2(\mathbf{R}^2)\cong \mathbf{R}^3\times S^1$.
- More generally, the configuration space of two points in $\mathbf{R}^n$ is homotopy equivalent to the sphere $S^{n-1}$.
- The configuration space of $n$ points in $\mathbf{R}^2$ is the classifying space of the $n$th braid group (see below).

== Connection to braid groups ==
The n-strand braid group on a connected topological space X is

$$B_n(X):=\pi_1(\operatorname{UConf}_n(X)),$$

the fundamental group of the n^{th} unordered configuration space of X. The n-strand pure braid group on X is

$$P_n(X):=\pi_1(\operatorname{Conf}_n(X)).$$

The first studied braid groups were the Artin braid groups $B_n\cong\pi_1(\operatorname{UConf}_n(\mathbf{R}^2))$. While the above definition is not the one that Emil Artin gave, Adolf Hurwitz implicitly defined the Artin braid groups as fundamental groups of configuration spaces of the complex plane considerably before Artin's definition (in 1891).

It follows from this definition and the fact that $\operatorname{Conf}_n(\mathbf{R}^2)$ and $\operatorname{UConf}_n(\mathbf{R}^2)$ are Eilenberg–MacLane spaces of type $K(\pi,1)$, that the unordered configuration space of the plane $\operatorname{UConf}_n(\mathbf{R}^2)$ is a classifying space for the Artin braid group, and $\operatorname{Conf}_n(\mathbf{R}^2)$ is a classifying space for the pure Artin braid group, when both are considered as discrete groups.

== Configuration spaces of manifolds ==
If the original space $X$ is a manifold, its ordered configuration spaces are open subspaces of the powers of $X$ and are thus themselves manifolds. The configuration space of distinct unordered points is also a manifold, while the configuration space of not necessarily distinct unordered points is instead an orbifold.

A configuration space is a type of classifying space or (fine) moduli space. In particular, there is a universal bundle $\pi\colon E_n\to C_n$ which is a sub-bundle of the trivial bundle $C_n\times X\to C_n$, and which has the property that the fiber over each point $p\in C_n$ is the n element subset of $X$ classified by p.

=== Homotopy invariance ===
The homotopy type of configuration spaces is not homotopy invariant. For example, the spaces $\operatorname{Conf}_n(\mathbb R^m)$ are not homotopy equivalent for any two distinct values of $m$: $\mathrm{Conf}_n(\mathbb{R}^0)$ is empty for $n \ge 2$, $\operatorname{Conf}_n(\mathbb R)$ is not connected for $n \ge 2$, $\operatorname{Conf}_n(\mathbb R^2)$ is an Eilenberg–MacLane space of type $K(\pi,1)$, and $\operatorname{Conf}_n(\mathbb R^m)$ is simply connected for $m \geq 3$.

It used to be an open question whether there were examples of compact manifolds which were homotopy equivalent but had non-homotopy equivalent configuration spaces: such an example was found only in 2005 by Riccardo Longoni and Paolo Salvatore. Their example are two three-dimensional lens spaces, and the configuration spaces of at least two points in them. That these configuration spaces are not homotopy equivalent was detected by Massey products in their respective universal covers. Homotopy invariance for configuration spaces of simply connected closed manifolds remains open in general, and has been proved to hold over the base field $\mathbf{R}$. Real homotopy invariance of simply connected compact manifolds with simply connected boundary of dimension at least 4 was also proved.

== Configuration spaces of graphs ==
Some results are particular to configuration spaces of graphs. This problem can be related to robotics and motion planning: one can imagine placing several robots on tracks and trying to navigate them to different positions without collision. The tracks correspond to (the edges of) a graph, the robots correspond to particles, and successful navigation corresponds to a path in the configuration space of that graph.

For any graph $\Gamma$, $\operatorname{Conf}_n(\Gamma)$ is an Eilenberg–MacLane space of type $K(\pi,1)$ and strong deformation retracts to a CW complex of dimension $b(\Gamma)$, where $b(\Gamma)$ is the number of vertices of degree at least 3. Moreover, $\operatorname{UConf}_n(\Gamma)$ and $\operatorname{Conf}_n(\Gamma)$ deformation retract to non-positively curved cubical complexes of dimension at most $\min(n, b(\Gamma))$.

== Configuration spaces of mechanical linkages ==
One also defines the configuration space of a mechanical linkage with the graph $\Gamma$ its underlying geometry. Such a graph is commonly assumed to be constructed as concatenation of rigid rods and hinges. The configuration space of such a linkage is defined as the totality of all its admissible positions in the Euclidean space equipped with a proper metric. The configuration space of a generic linkage is a smooth manifold, for example, for the trivial planar linkage made of $n$ rigid rods connected with revolute joints, the configuration space is the n-torus $T^n$. The simplest singularity point in such configuration spaces is a product of a cone on a homogeneous quadratic hypersurface by a Euclidean space. Such a singularity point emerges for linkages which can be divided into two sub-linkages such that their respective endpoints trace-paths intersect in a non-transverse manner, for example linkage which can be aligned (i.e. completely be folded into a line).

== Compactification ==
The configuration space $\operatorname{Conf}_n(X)$ of distinct points is non-compact, having ends where the points tend to approach each other (become confluent). Many geometric applications require compact spaces, so one would like to compactify $\operatorname{Conf}_n(X)$, i.e., embed it as an open subset of a compact space with suitable properties. Approaches to this problem have been given by Raoul Bott and Clifford Taubes, as well as William Fulton and Robert MacPherson.

== See also ==
- Configuration space (physics)
- State space (physics)
