= Joan Birman =

American mathematician

Joan Sylvia Lyttle Birman
- Born: May 30, 1927 (age 99); New York City, New York, U.S.
- Education: Barnard College (BA, 1948); Courant Institute (NYU) (PhD, 1968)
- Known for: Braid theory, knot theory
- Awards: Chauvenet Prize; AAAS member; Sloan Fellow; Guggenheim Fellow; AMS Fellow; AWM Fellow; National Academy of Sciences member
- Scientific career
- Fields: Mathematics
- Workplaces: Barnard College; Columbia University; University of Haifa
- Thesis: Braid Groups and Their Relationship to Mapping Class Groups (1968)
- Doctoral advisor: Wilhelm Magnus
- Doctoral students: Tara E. Brendle; Efstratia Kalfagianni; Józef H. Przytycki
- Website: www.math.columbia.edu/~jb/

Joan Sylvia Lyttle Birman (born May 30, 1927, in New York City) is an American mathematician, specializing in low-dimensional topology. She has made contributions to the study of knots, 3-manifolds, mapping class groups of surfaces, geometric group theory, contact structures and dynamical systems. Birman is research professor emerita at Barnard College, Columbia University, where she has been since 1973.

== Family ==
Her parents were George and Lillian Lyttle, both Jewish. Her father was from Russia but grew up in Liverpool, England. At age 17, George emigrated to the US and became a successful dress manufacturer. Her mother was born in New York and her parents were Russian-Polish immigrants.

Birman's father appreciated the opportunities from having a business but he wanted his daughters to focus on education.

Joan Birman married Joseph Birman in 1950, the year she and he gained Masters degrees in their respective fields. They have three children, Kenneth Paul Birman, Deborah Birman Shlider, and Carl David Birman. Her husband, who died in October 2016, was a physicist and a leading advocate for human rights for scientists.

== Education ==
After high school, Birman entered Swarthmore College, a coeducational institution in Swarthmore, Pennsylvania, and majored in mathematics. However, she disliked living in the dorms so she transferred to Barnard College, a women-only college affiliated with Columbia University, in order to live at home.

Birman received her B.A. in mathematics from Barnard College in 1948 and an M.A. in physics from Columbia University in 1950. After working in industry from 1950 to 1960, she studied mathematics at the Courant Institute at New York University under the supervision of Wilhelm Magnus, earning her PhD in 1968. Her dissertation was titled "Braid groups and their relationship to mapping class groups".

== Career ==
After she earned her bachelor's degree from Barnard, Birman accepted a position at the Polytechnic Research and Development Co., which was affiliated with Brooklyn Polytechnic University. She later worked for the Technical Research Group and the W. L. Maxson Corporation.

Birman's first academic position was at the Stevens Institute of Technology (1968–1973). When she joined, she was the only female professor of its 160-member faculty. In 1969 she published "On Braid Groups", which introduced a way to relate the mapping class group of a surface to the mapping class group of a punctured version of the same surface. Known as the Birman Exact Sequence, this has become one of the most important tools in the study of braids and surfaces. During the later part of this period, in 1974, she published a monograph, Braids, Links, and Mapping Class Groups, based on a graduate course she taught as a visiting professor at Princeton University in 1971–72. It is considered the first comprehensive treatment of braid theory. It introduced the modern theory to the field and offered the first complete proof of the Markov theorem on braids.

In 1973, she joined the faculty of Barnard College, where she served as chair of the Mathematics Department from 1973 to 1987, 1989 to 1991, and 1995 to 1998. She was a visiting scholar at the Institute for Advanced Study in the summer of 1988.

She supervised 21 doctoral students, and has a total of 70 academic descendants. Her doctoral students include Józef Przytycki and Tara E. Brendle.

Birman was a founding editor of the journals Geometry and Topology and Algebraic and Geometric Topology.

Birman was a co-founder of Mathematical Sciences Publishing, a non-profit publishing house. She was a member of the New York Academy of Sciences Human Rights of Scientists Committee.

== Work ==
According to her MathSciNet author profile, Birman's scientific work includes 106 research publications and over 300 published reviews in Math Reviews. She is the author of the research monograph Braids, Links, and Mapping Class Groups.

In 2026, Birman, with Vasudha Bharathram and Tara E. Brendle claimed that the Burau representation on 4 strands is faithful, but this claim has not yet been verified by the mathematics community and errors may be uncovered in the refereeing process.

== Recognition ==
In 1974, Birman was selected as a Sloan Research Fellow by the Alfred P. Sloan Foundation.

In 1994, she was selected as a Guggenheim Foundation Fellow by the John Simon Guggenheim Memorial Foundation. In 1996, the Mathematical Association of America awarded Birman the Chauvenet Prize, "the highest award for mathematical expository writing" for her 1993 essay New Points of View in Knot Theory. In 1997, Birman received an honorary doctorate from the Technion Israel Institute of Technology.

In 2003, Birman was elected to the European Academy of Sciences. In 2005, she won the New York City Mayor's Award for Excellence in Science and Technology.

In 2012, Birman was elected to the American Academy of Arts and Sciences In 2015, Birman was named an honorary member of the London Mathematical Society. In 2021, Birman was elected to the National Academy of Sciences.

=== American Mathematical Society ===
From 1978 to 1980, and again from 1990 to 1992, Birman was an American Mathematical Society (AMS) Council member at large.

In 1990, Birman donated funds to the AMS to establish the Ruth Lyttle Satter Prize in Mathematics in honor of her sister, Ruth Lyttle Satter, who was a plant physiologist. In 2017, she endowed the Joan and Joseph Birman Fellowship for Women Scholars at the AMS to support mathematical research by mid-career women.

In 2013, she became a fellow of the American Mathematical Society in the inaugural class.

=== Association of Women in Mathematics ===
In 1987, she was selected by the Association for Women in Mathematics to be a Noether Lecturer, honoring her fundamental and sustained contributions to the mathematical sciences.

In 2015, the Association for Women in Mathematics began awarding the Joan & Joseph Birman Research Prize in Topology and Geometry. In 2020, they included her in that year's class of Fellows for "her groundbreaking research connecting diverse fields, and for her award-winning expository writing; for continuously supporting women in mathematics as an active mentor and a research role model; and for sponsoring multiple prize initiatives for women". The AWM also included her in a deck of cards featuring notable women mathematicians.

== Selected publications ==
- Birman, Joan S.; Hilden, Hugh M. (1973). "On Isotopies of Homeomorphisms of Riemann Surfaces". The Annals of Mathematics. 97 (3): 424. doi:10.2307/1970830.
- "Heegaard splittings of branched coverings of 𝑆³". Transactions of the American Mathematical Society. 213: 315–352. 1975.
- Birman, Joan S.; Lubotzky, Alex; McCarthy, John (1983). "Abelian and solvable subgroups of the mapping class groups". Duke Mathematical Journal. 50 (4): 1107–1120. doi:10.1215/S0012-7094-83-05046-9.
- Birman, Joan S.; Williams, R.F. (1983). "Knotted periodic orbits in dynamical systems—I: Lorenz's equation". Topology. 22: 47–82. doi:10.1016/0040-9383(83)90045-9.
- Birman, Joan S. (1985). "On the Jones polynomial of closed 3-braids". Inventiones Mathematicae. 81 (2): 287–294. Bibcode:1985InMat..81..287B. doi:10.1007/BF01389053. S2CID 123023534.
- Birman, Joan S.; Wenzl, Hans (1989). "Braids, link polynomials and a new algebra". Transactions of the American Mathematical Society. 313: 249–273. doi:10.1090/S0002-9947-1989-0992598-X.
- Birman, Joan S.; Menasco, William W. (1990). "Studying links via closed braids IV: composite links and split links". Inventiones Mathematicae. 102: 115–139. arXiv:math/0407403. Bibcode:1990InMat.102..115B. doi:10.1007/BF01233423. S2CID 189830532.
- Birman, Joan S.; Lin, Xiao-Song (1993). "Knot polynomials and Vassiliev's invariants". Inventiones Mathematicae. 111: 225–270. Bibcode:1993InMat.111..225B. doi:10.1007/BF01231287. S2CID 122687215.
- Birman, Joan; Ko, Ki Hyoung; Lee, Sang Jin (1998). "A New Approach to the Word and Conjugacy Problems in the Braid Groups". Advances in Mathematics. 139 (2): 322–353. arXiv:math/9712211. doi:10.1006/aima.1998.1761. S2CID 1079633.
- Birman, Joan S.; Wrinkle, Nancy C. (2000). "On Transversally Simple Knots". Journal of Differential Geometry. 55 (2): 325–354. arXiv:math/9910170. doi:10.4310/jdg/1090340880. S2CID 16145645.
- Birman, Joan S.; Ko, Ki Hyoung; Lee, Sang Jin (2001). "The Infimum, Supremum, and Geodesic Length of a Braid Conjugacy Class". Advances in Mathematics. 164: 41–56. arXiv:math/0003125. doi:10.1006/aima.2001.2010. S2CID 15513091.
- Birman, Joan; Margalit, Dan; Menasco, William (2016). "Efficient geodesics and an effective algorithm for distance in the complex of curves". Mathematische Annalen. 366 (3–4): 1253–1279. arXiv:1408.4133. doi:10.1007/s00208-015-1357-y. S2CID 119321516.
- Braids, links and mapping class groups. Annals of Mathematics Studies. Princeton University Press. 1975. ISBN 978-0691081496. MR 0375281.
- Bharathram, Vasudha; Birman, Joan S.; Brendle, Tara E. (2026-07-07), The Burau representation of the braid group is faithful for n = 4, doi:10.48550/ARXIV.2607.05283

== See also ==
- Birman–Wenzl algebra
