= Stephen Bigelow =

Australian mathematician

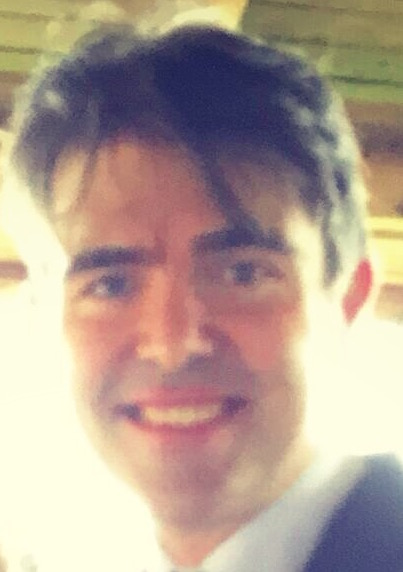
Stephen Bigelow

Stephen John Bigelow is an Australian mathematician and professor of mathematics at the University of California, Santa Barbara. He is known for his proof that braid groups are linear, concurrently with and independently of another proof by Daan Krammer.

Bigelow earned bachelor's and master's degrees in 1992 and 1994 from the University of Melbourne. He completed his PhD in 2000 from the University of California, Berkeley under the joint supervision of Robion Kirby and Andrew Casson. He returned to Melbourne for two years as a research fellow before joining the UCSB faculty in 2002.

Bigelow was an invited speaker at the International Congress of Mathematicians in 2002, speaking on representations of braid groups. He was a Sloan Research Fellow for 2002–2006. In 2012 he was designated as one of the inaugural fellows of the American Mathematical Society.
