= Arthur Bartels =

German mathematician

Arthur Bartels (born 12 October 1971) is a German mathematician.

== Biography ==
Bartels was born in Tübingen. After completing his Abitur in Wiesbaden and then Zivildienst (alternative civilian service instead of military service), he studied mathematics from 1992 at the University of Mainz and the University of Manchester with Diplom in Mainz in 1997 under Matthias Kreck with Diplom thesis Morsetheorie und Faserbündel über den Kreis (Morse theory and fiber bundles over the circle). Bartels received his PhD in 1999 under the direction of Peter Teichner at the University of California, San Diego with doctoral thesis Link homotopy in codimension 2. As a postdoc Bartels was at the University of Münster, where he habilitated in 2005 and was an assistant. He became in 2007 a lecturer at Imperial College London and in 2008 a full professor at the University of Münster.

He is concerned with topology, including the Farrell–Jones conjecture about the algebraic structure of the K-theory and L-theory of group rings, which he proved in special cases with colleagues; specifically, he proved the case of mapping class groups with Mladen Bestvina and the cases of hyperbolic groups and CAT(0)-groups with Wolfgang Lück and Holger Reich.

In 2018 in Rio de Janeiro Bartels was an invited speaker at the International Congress of Mathematicians with talk K-theory and actions on Euclidean retracts.

== Selected publications ==
- Bartels, Arthur; Farrel, Tom; Jones, Lowell; Reich, Holger (2004). "On the Isomorphism Conjecture in algebraic K-theory". Topology. 43: 157–213. arXiv:math/0108139. doi:10.1016/s0040-9383(03)00032-6. S2CID 9382291.
- Bartels, Arthur; Bestvina, Mladen (2016). "The Farrell-Jones Conjecture for mapping class groups". arXiv:1606.02844 [math.GT].
- Bartels, Arthur; Lück, Wolfgang (2012). "The Borel Conjecture for hyperbolic and CAT(0)-groups". Annals of Mathematics. 175 (2): 631–689. arXiv:0901.0442. doi:10.4007/annals.2012.175.2.5. S2CID 16299041.
- Bartels, Arthur (2012). "On proofs of the Farrell-Jones Conjecture". arXiv:1210.1044 [math.GT].
- Bartels, Arthur; Rosenthal, David (2006). "On the K-theory of groups with finite asymptotic dimension". arXiv:math/0605088.
- Bartels, Arthur; Lück, Wolfgang; Reich, Holger (2008). "On the Farrell-Jones Conjecture and its applications". Journal of Topology. 1: 57–86. arXiv:math/0703548. doi:10.1112/jtopol/jtm008. S2CID 17731576.
- Bartels, Arthur; Lück, Wolfgang; Reich, Holger (2007). "The K-theoretic Farrell-Jones Conjecture for hyperbolic groups". Inventiones Mathematicae. 172 (1): 29–70. arXiv:math/0701434. Bibcode:2007InMat.172...29B. doi:10.1007/s00222-007-0093-7. S2CID 8627226.
