= Journal of Topology =

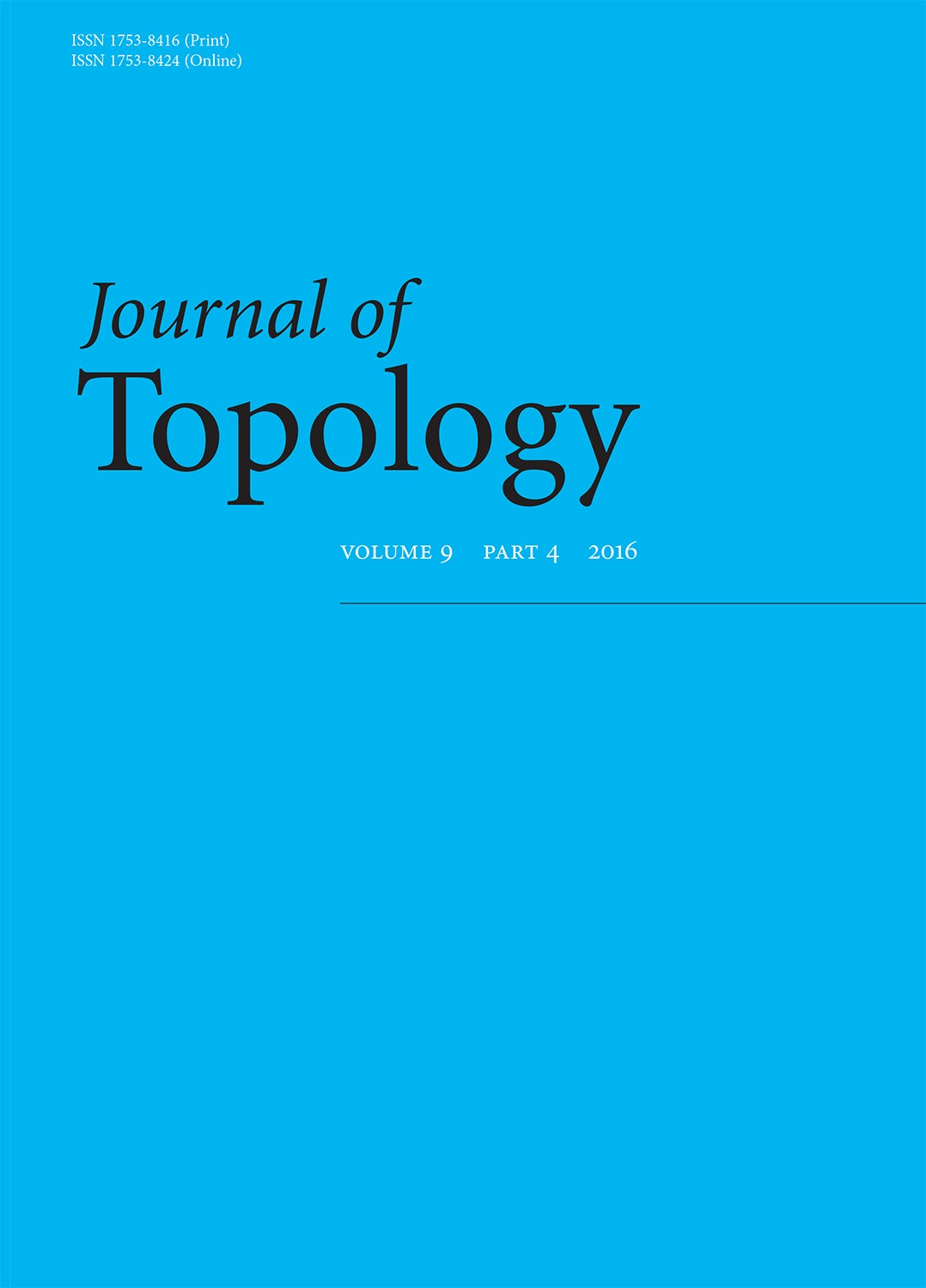
- Discipline: Topology
- Language: English
- Edited by: Ivan Smith

Publication details
- History: 2008–present
- Publisher: John Wiley & Sons on behalf of the London Mathematical Society
- Frequency: Quarterly
- Impact factor: 1.1 (2022)

Standard abbreviations
- ISO 4: J. Topol.

Indexing
- ISSN: 1753-8424
- LCCN: 2008210020
- OCLC no.: 643146824

Links
- Journal homepage; Online access; Online archive

The Journal of Topology is a peer-reviewed scientific journal which publishes papers of high quality and significance in topology, geometry, and adjacent areas of mathematics. It was established in 2008, when the editorial board of Topology resigned due to the increasing costs of Elsevier's subscriptions.

The journal is owned and managed by the London Mathematical Society and produced, distributed, sold and marketed by John Wiley & Sons. It appears quarterly with articles published individually online prior to appearing in a printed issue.

== Editorial board ==
- Arthur Bartels (University of Münster)
- Andrew Blumberg (University of Texas at Austin)
- Jeffrey Brock (Yale University)
- Simon Donaldson (Imperial College London)
- Cornelia Druţu Badea (University of Oxford)
- Mark Gross (University of Cambridge)
- Lars Hesselholt (University of Copenhagen)
- Misha Kapovich (UC Davis)
- Frances Kirwan (University of Oxford)
- Marc Lackenby (University of Oxford)
- Oscar Randal-Williams (University of Cambridge)
- Jacob Rasmussen (University of Cambridge)
- Ivan Smith (University of Cambridge)
- Constantin Teleman (University of California, Berkeley)

== Abstracting and indexing ==
The journal is abstracted and indexed in Mathematical Reviews, Science Citation Index, and Zentralblatt MATH.
