= Mapping class group =

Group of isotopy classes of a topological automorphism group

In mathematics, in the subfield of geometric topology, the mapping class group is an important algebraic invariant of a topological space. Briefly, the mapping class group is a certain discrete group corresponding to symmetries of the space.

== Motivation ==
Consider a topological space, that is, a space with some notion of closeness between points in the space. We can consider the set of homeomorphisms from the space into itself, that is, continuous maps with continuous inverses: functions which stretch and deform the space continuously without breaking or gluing the space. This set of homeomorphisms can be thought of as a space itself. It forms a group under functional composition. We can also define a topology on this new space of homeomorphisms. The open sets of this new function space will be made up of sets of functions that map compact subsets K into open subsets U as K and U range throughout our original topological space, completed with their finite intersections (which must be open by definition of topology) and arbitrary unions (again which must be open). This gives a notion of continuity on the space of functions, so that we can consider continuous deformation of the homeomorphisms themselves called homotopies. We define the mapping class group by taking homotopy classes of homeomorphisms, and inducing the group structure from the functional composition group structure already present on the space of homeomorphisms.

== Definition ==
The term mapping class group has a flexible usage. Most often it is used in the context of a manifold M. The mapping class group of M is interpreted as the group of isotopy classes of automorphisms of M. So if M is a topological manifold, the mapping class group is the group of isotopy classes of homeomorphisms of M. If M is a smooth manifold, the mapping class group is the group of isotopy classes of diffeomorphisms of M. Whenever the group of automorphisms of an object X has a natural topology, the mapping class group of X is defined as $\operatorname{Aut}(X)/\operatorname{Aut}_0(X)$, where $\operatorname{Aut}_0(X)$ is the path-component of the identity in $\operatorname{Aut}(X)$. (Notice that in the compact-open topology, path components and isotopy classes coincide, i.e., two maps f and g are in the same path-component iff they are isotopic). For topological spaces, this is usually the compact-open topology. In the low-dimensional topology literature, the mapping class group of X is usually denoted MCG(X), although it is also frequently denoted $\pi_0(\operatorname{Aut}(X))$, where one substitutes for Aut the appropriate group for the category to which X belongs. Here $\pi_0$ denotes the 0-th homotopy group of a space.

So in general, there is a short exact sequence of groups:

$$1 \rightarrow \operatorname{Aut}_0(X) \rightarrow \operatorname{Aut}(X) \rightarrow \operatorname{MCG}(X) \rightarrow 1.$$

Frequently this sequence is not split.

If working in the homotopy category, the mapping class group of X is the group of homotopy classes of homotopy equivalences of X.

There are many subgroups of mapping class groups that are frequently studied. If M is an oriented manifold, $\operatorname{Aut}(M)$ would be the orientation-preserving automorphisms of M and so the mapping class group of M (as an oriented manifold) would be index two in the mapping class group of M (as an unoriented manifold) provided M admits an orientation-reversing automorphism. Similarly, the subgroup that acts as the identity on all the homology groups of M is called the Torelli group of M.

== Examples ==
=== Sphere ===
In any category (smooth, PL, topological, homotopy)

$$\operatorname{MCG}(S^2) \simeq \Z/2\Z,$$

corresponding to maps of degree ±1.

=== Torus ===
In the homotopy category

$$\operatorname{MCG}(\mathbf{T}^n) \simeq \operatorname{GL}(n,\Z).$$

This is because the n-dimensional torus $\mathbf{T}^n = (S^1)^n$ is an Eilenberg–MacLane space.

For other categories if $n\ge 5$, one has the following split-exact sequences:

In the category of topological spaces

$$0\to \Z_2^\infty\to \operatorname{MCG}(\mathbf{T}^n) \to \operatorname{GL}(n,\Z)\to 0$$

In the PL-category

$$0\to \Z_2^\infty\oplus\binom n2\Z_2\to \operatorname{MCG}(\mathbf{T}^n)\to \operatorname{GL}(n,\Z)\to 0$$

(⊕ representing direct sum). In the smooth category

$$0\to \Z_2^\infty\oplus\binom n2\Z_2\oplus\sum_{i=0}^n\binom n i\Gamma_{i+1}\to \operatorname{MCG}(\mathbf{T}^n)\to \operatorname{GL}(n,\Z)\to 0$$

where $\Gamma_i$ are the Kervaire–Milnor finite abelian groups of homotopy spheres and $\Z_2$ is the group of order 2.

=== Surfaces ===
The mapping class groups of surfaces have been heavily studied, and are sometimes called Teichmüller modular groups (note the special case of $\operatorname{MCG}(\mathbf{T}^2)$ above), since they act on Teichmüller space and the quotient is the moduli space of Riemann surfaces homeomorphic to the surface. These groups exhibit features similar both to hyperbolic groups and to higher rank linear groups. They have many applications in Thurston's theory of geometric three-manifolds (for example, to surface bundles). The elements of this group have also been studied by themselves: an important result is the Nielsen–Thurston classification theorem, and a generating family for the group is given by Dehn twists which are in a sense the "simplest" mapping classes. Every finite group is a subgroup of the mapping class group of a closed, orientable surface; in fact one can realize any finite group as the group of isometries of some compact Riemann surface (which immediately implies that it injects in the mapping class group of the underlying topological surface).

==== Non-orientable surfaces ====
Some non-orientable surfaces have mapping class groups with simple presentations. For example, every homeomorphism of the real projective plane $\mathbf{P}^2(\R)$ is isotopic to the identity:

$$\operatorname{MCG}(\mathbf{P}^2(\R)) = 1.$$

The mapping class group of the Klein bottle K is:

$$\operatorname{MCG}(K)= \Z_2 \oplus  \Z_2.$$

The four elements are the identity, a Dehn twist on a two-sided curve which does not bound a Möbius strip, the y-homeomorphism of Lickorish, and the product of the twist and the y-homeomorphism. It is a nice exercise to show that the square of the Dehn twist is isotopic to the identity.

We also remark that the closed genus three non-orientable surface N_{3} (the connected sum of three projective planes) has:

$$\operatorname{MCG}(N_3) = \operatorname{GL}(2,\Z).$$

This is because the surface N has a unique class of one-sided curves such that, when N is cut open along such a curve C, the resulting surface $N\setminus C$ is a torus with a disk removed. As an unoriented surface, its mapping class group is $\operatorname{GL}(2,\Z)$. (Lemma 2.1).

=== 3-Manifolds ===
Mapping class groups of 3-manifolds have received considerable study as well, and are closely related to mapping class groups of 2-manifolds. For example, any finite group can be realized as the mapping class group (and also the isometry group) of a compact hyperbolic 3-manifold.

== Mapping class groups of pairs ==
Given a pair of spaces (X,A) the mapping class group of the pair is the isotopy-classes of automorphisms of the pair, where an automorphism of (X,A) is defined as an automorphism of X that preserves A, i.e. f: X → X is invertible and f(A) = A.

=== Symmetry group of knot and links ===
If K ⊂ S^{3} is a knot or a link, the symmetry group of the knot (resp. link) is defined to be the mapping class group of the pair (S^{3}, K). The symmetry group of a hyperbolic knot is known to be dihedral or cyclic; moreover every dihedral and cyclic group can be realized as symmetry groups of knots. The symmetry group of a torus knot is known to be of order two Z_{2}.

== Torelli group ==
Notice that there is an induced action of the mapping class group on the homology (and cohomology) of the space X. This is because (co)homology is functorial and Homeo_{0} acts trivially (because all elements are isotopic, hence homotopic to the identity, which acts trivially, and action on (co)homology is invariant under homotopy). The kernel of this action is the Torelli group, named after the Torelli theorem.

In the case of orientable surfaces, this is the action on first cohomology H^{1}(Σ) ≅ Z^{2g}. Orientation-preserving maps are precisely those that act trivially on top cohomology H^{2}(Σ) ≅ Z. H^{1}(Σ) has a symplectic structure, coming from the cup product; since these maps are automorphisms, and maps preserve the cup product, the mapping class group acts as symplectic automorphisms, and indeed all symplectic automorphisms are realized, yielding the short exact sequence:

$$1 \to \operatorname{Tor}(\Sigma) \to \operatorname{MCG}(\Sigma) \to \operatorname{Sp}(H^1(\Sigma)) \cong \operatorname{Sp}_{2g}(\mathbf{Z}) \to 1$$

One can extend this to

$$1 \to \operatorname{Tor}(\Sigma) \to \operatorname{MCG}^*(\Sigma) \to \operatorname{Sp}^{\pm}(H^1(\Sigma)) \cong \operatorname{Sp}^{\pm}_{2g}(\mathbf{Z}) \to 1$$

The symplectic group is well understood. Hence understanding the algebraic structure of the mapping class group often reduces to questions about the Torelli group.

Note that for the torus (genus 1) the map to the symplectic group is an isomorphism, and the Torelli group vanishes.

== Stable mapping class group ==
One can embed the surface $\Sigma_{g,1}$ of genus g and 1 boundary component into $\Sigma_{g+1,1}$ by attaching an additional hole on the end (i.e., gluing together $\Sigma_{g,1}$ and $\Sigma_{1,2}$), and thus automorphisms of the small surface fixing the boundary extend to the larger surface. Taking the direct limit of these groups and inclusions yields the stable mapping class group, whose rational cohomology ring was conjectured by David Mumford (one of conjectures called the Mumford conjectures). In 2007, Ib Madsen and Michael Weiss published a proof of Mumford's conjecture, based on a computation of the integral (not just rational) cohomology ring. However doubts have been raised concerning an unproved assertion in their paper on the existence of extended triangulations of smooth manifolds.

== See also ==
- Braid groups, the mapping class groups of punctured discs
- Homotopy groups
- Homeotopy groups
- Lantern relation
