= Andy Wallace =

Andy Wallace may refer to:

- Andy Wallace (producer) (born 1947), music producer
- Andy Wallace (racing driver) (born 1961), race car driver
- Andy Wallace (field hockey) (born 1959), field hockey player

== See also ==
- Andrew Wallace, Australian politician
- Andrew H. Wallace, Scottish-American mathematician
