= Mumford conjecture =

There are several conjectures in mathematics by David Mumford.

- Mumford's conjecture about reductive groups, now called Haboush's theorem.
- The Mumford conjecture on the cohomology of the stable mapping class group, proved by Ib Madsen and Michael Weiss.
- The Manin-Mumford conjecture about Jacobians of curves, proved by Michel Raynaud.
