= Homeotopy =

Type of homotopy group of a topological space

In algebraic topology, an area of mathematics, a homeotopy group of a topological space is a homotopy group of the group of self-homeomorphisms of that space.

== Definition ==
The homotopy group functors $\pi_k$ assign to each path-connected topological space $X$ the group $\pi_k(X)$ of homotopy classes of continuous maps $S^k\to X.$

Another construction on a space $X$ is the group of all self-homeomorphisms $X \to X$, denoted ${\rm Homeo}(X).$ If X is a locally compact, locally connected Hausdorff space then a fundamental result of R. Arens says that ${\rm Homeo}(X)$ will in fact be a topological group under the compact-open topology.

Under the above assumptions, the homeotopy groups for $X$ are defined to be:

$$HME_k(X)=\pi_k({\rm Homeo}(X)).$$

Thus $HME_0(X)=\pi_0({\rm Homeo}(X))=MCG^*(X)$ is the mapping class group for $X.$ In other words, the mapping class group is the set of connected components of ${\rm Homeo}(X)$ as specified by the functor $\pi_0.$

== Example ==
According to the Dehn-Nielsen theorem, if $X$ is a closed surface then $HME_0(X)={\rm Out}(\pi_1(X)),$ i.e., the zeroth homotopy group of the automorphisms of a space is the same as the outer automorphism group of its fundamental group.
