= Tim Cochran =

American mathematician

- Tim Cochran at Multnomah Falls in 2012
- Born: April 7, 1955
- Died: December 16, 2014 (aged 59)
- Education: University of California
- Known for: Cochran–Orr–Teichner (solvable) filtration
- Scientific career
- Fields: Mathematics
- Workplaces: Rice University
- Doctoral advisor: Robion Kirby
- Doctoral students: Shelly Harvey

Thomas "Tim" Daniel Cochran (April 7, 1955 – December 16, 2014) was a professor of mathematics at Rice University specializing in topology, especially low-dimensional topology, the theory of knots and links and associated algebra.

== Education and career ==
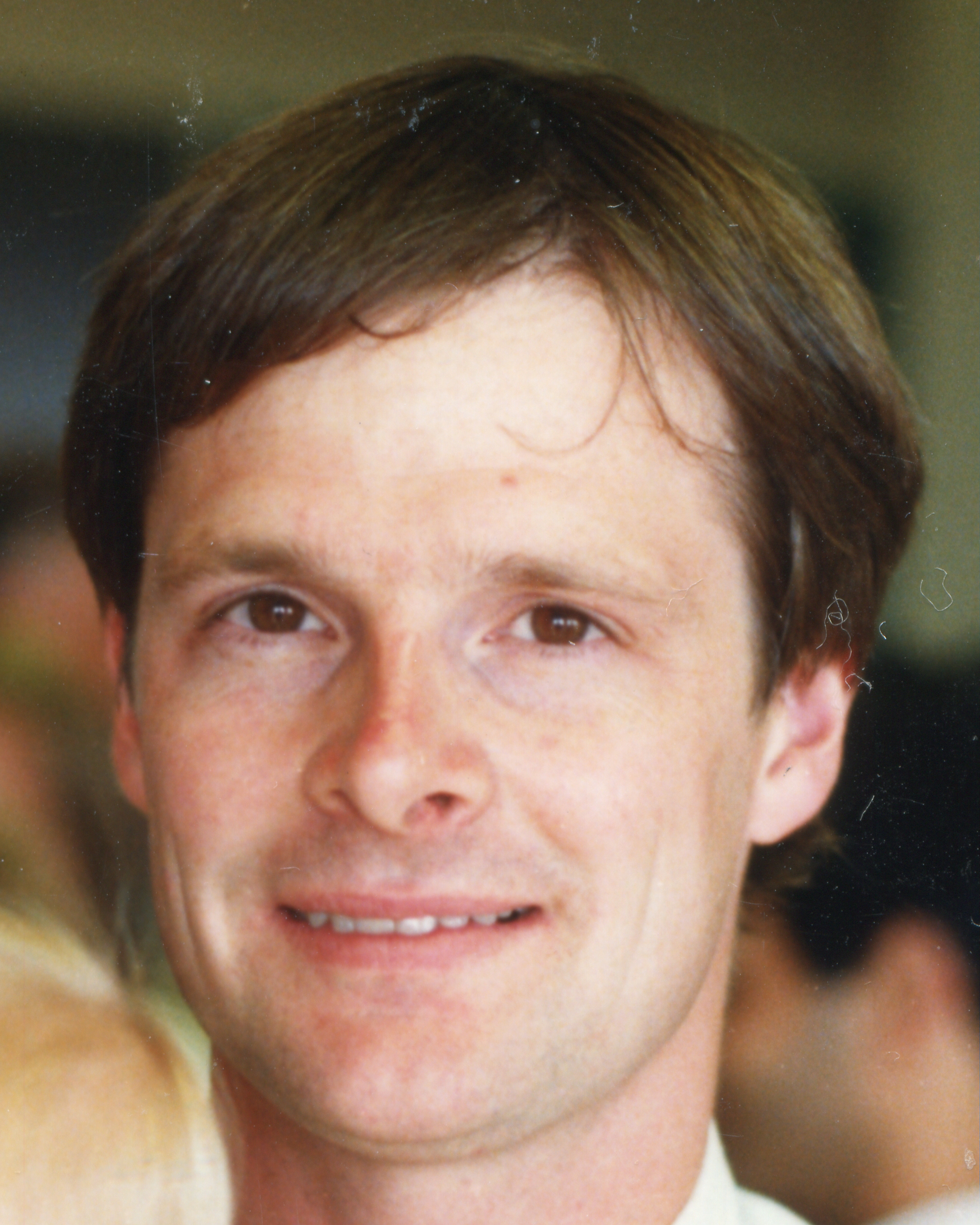
Cochran in 1986

Tim Cochran was a valedictorian for the Severna Park High School Class of 1973. Later, he was an undergraduate at the Massachusetts Institute of Technology, and received his Ph.D. from the University of California, Berkeley in 1982 (Embedding 4-manifolds in S^{5}). He then returned to MIT as a C.L.E. Moore Postdoctoral Instructor from 1982 to 1984. He was an NSF postdoctoral fellow from 1985 to 1987. Following brief appointments at Berkeley and Northwestern University, he started at Rice University as an associate professor in 1990. He became a full professor at Rice University in 1998. He died unexpectedly, aged 59, on December 16, 2014, while on a year-long sabbatical leave supported by a fellowship from the Simons Foundation.

== Research contributions ==
With his coauthors Kent Orr and Peter Teichner, Cochran defined the solvable filtration of the knot concordance group, whose lower levels encapsulate many classical knot concordance invariants.

Cochran was also responsible for naming the slam-dunk move for surgery diagrams in low-dimensional topology.

== Awards and honors ==
While at Rice, he was named an Outstanding Faculty Associate (1992–93), and received the Faculty Teaching and Mentoring Award from the Rice Graduate Student Association (2014)

He was named a fellow of the American Mathematical Society in 2014, for contributions to low-dimensional topology, specifically knot and link concordance, and for mentoring numerous junior mathematicians.

== Selected publications ==
- Cochran, T. (1984). "Four-manifolds which embed in $\mathbb{R}^6$ but not in $\mathbb{R}^5$ and Seifert manifolds for fibered knots". Inventiones Mathematicae. 77: 173–184. doi:10.1007/BF01389141. S2CID 121286879.
- Cochran, Tim D. (1985). "Geometric invariants of link cobordism". Commentarii Mathematici Helvetici. 60: 291–311. doi:10.1007/BF02567416. S2CID 120444453.
- Cochran, Tim D. (1990). "Derivatives of links: Massey products and Milnor's concordance invariants". Memoirs of the American Mathematical Society. 84 (427). doi:10.1090/memo/0427.
- Cochran, Tim D.; Orr, Kent E. (1993). "Not all links are concordant to boundary links". Annals of Mathematics. 138 (3): 519–554. doi:10.2307/2946555. JSTOR 2946555.
- Cochran, Tim D.; Orr, Kent E.; Teichner, Peter (2003). "Knot Concordance, Whitney Towers and $L^2$-signatures". Annals of Mathematics. 157 (2): 433–519. arXiv:math/9908117. doi:10.4007/annals.2003.157.433.
- Cochran, Tim D.; Orr, Kent E.; Teichner, Peter (2004). "Structure in the Classical Knot Concordance Group". Commentarii Mathematici Helvetici. 79 (1): 105–123. arXiv:math/0206059. doi:10.1007/s00014-001-0793-6.
- Cochran, Tim D. (2004). "Noncommutative Knot Theory". Algebraic and Geometric Topology. 4: 347–398. arXiv:math/0206258. doi:10.2140/agt.2004.4.347.
- Cochran, Tim D.; Teichner, Peter (2007). "Knot Concordance and von Neumann $\rho$-invariants". Duke Mathematical Journal. 137 (2): 337–379. arXiv:math/0411057. doi:10.1215/S0012-7094-07-13723-2. S2CID 119495376.
- Cochran, Tim D.; Harvey, Shelly (2008). "Homology and Derived Series of Groups II: Dwyer's Theorem". Geometry and Topology. 12 (1): 199–232. arXiv:math/0609484. doi:10.2140/gt.2008.12.199.
- Cochran, Tim D.; Harvey, Shelly; Leidy, Constance (2009). "Knot concordance and Higher-order Blanchfield duality". Geometry and Topology. 13 (3): 1419–1482. arXiv:0710.3082. doi:10.2140/gt.2009.13.1419.
- Cochran, Tim D.; Harvey, Shelly; Leidy, Constance (2011). "Primary decomposition and the fractal nature of knot concordance". Mathematische Annalen. 351 (2): 443–508. arXiv:0906.1373. doi:10.1007/s00208-010-0604-5. S2CID 7556758.
- Cochran, Tim D.; Davis, Christopher William (2015). "Counterexamples to Kauffman's conjectures on slice knots". Advances in Mathematics. 274: 263–284. arXiv:1303.4418. doi:10.1016/j.aim.2014.12.006.
