= Kenneth Millett =

American mathematician (born 1941)

Kenneth C. Millett (born 1941) is a professor of mathematics at the University of California, Santa Barbara. His research concerns low-dimensional topology, knot theory, and the applications of knot theory to DNA structure; his initial is the "M" in the name of the HOMFLY polynomial.

Millett graduated from the Massachusetts Institute of Technology in 1963 with a bachelor's degree in mathematics. He earned his Ph.D. in 1967 from the University of Wisconsin under the supervision of Edward R. Fadell. After short-term instructor positions at the University of California, Los Angeles and MIT, he joined the UCSB faculty in 1969 and was promoted to professor in 1979.

Millett won the Carl B. Allendoerfer Award of the Mathematical Association of America in 1989 and the Chauvenet Prize in 1991 for a paper on knot theory with W. B. R. Lickorish. He became a fellow of the American Association for the Advancement of Science in 2000. In 2012, he became one of the inaugural fellows of the American Mathematical Society.

== Selected publications ==
- with Eric J. Rawdon, Andrzej Stasiak: Rawdon, Eric J.; Millett, Kenneth C.; Stasiak, Andrzej (2015). "Subknots in ideal knots, random knots, and knotted proteins". Sci. Rep. 5 8928. Bibcode:2015NatSR...5.8928R. doi:10.1038/srep08928. PMC 4354144. PMID 25753957.
- with Michal Jamroz, Wanda Niemyska, Eric J. Rawdon, Andrzej Stasiak, Piotr Sułkowski, Joanna I. Sulkowska: Jamroz, Michal; Niemyska, Wanda; Rawdon, Eric J.; Stasiak, Andrzej; Millett, Kenneth C.; Sułkowski, Piotr; Sulkowska, Joanna I. (28 January 2015). "KnotProt: a database of proteins with knots and slipknots". Nucleic Acids Res. 43 (Database issue): D306–D314. doi:10.1093/nar/gku1059. PMC 4383900. PMID 25361973.
- with Joanna I. Sułkowska, Eric J. Rawdon, Jose N. Onuchic, Andrzej Stasiak: Sulkowska, J. I.; Rawdon, E. J.; Millett, K. C.; Onuchic, J. N.; Stasiak, A. (26 June 2012). "Conservation of complex knotting and slipknotting patterns in proteins". Proc Natl Acad Sci U S A. 109 (26): E1715–E1723. doi:10.1073/pnas.1205918109. PMC 3387036. PMID 22685208.
- with D. Jonish: Jonish, D.; Millett, K. C. (1991). "Isotopy invariants of graphs". Trans. Amer. Math. Soc. 327 (2): 655–702. doi:10.1090/s0002-9947-1991-1062189-2. MR 1062189.
- with P. Freyd, D. Yetter, J. Hoste, W. B. R. Lickorish and A. Ocneanu: Freyd, P.; Yetter, D.; Hoste, J.; Lickorish, W. B. R.; Millett, K.; Ocneanu, A. (1985). "A new polynomial invariant of knots and links". Bull. Amer. Math. Soc. (N.S.). 12 (2): 239–246. doi:10.1090/s0273-0979-1985-15361-3. MR 0776477.
- Millett, Kenneth C. (1978). "Piecewise linear embeddings of balls into contractible manifolds". Proc. Amer. Math. Soc. 70: 85–86. doi:10.1090/s0002-9939-1978-0467761-5. MR 0467761.
- Millett, Kenneth C. (1976). "Piecewise linear bundles in the metastable range". Trans. Amer. Math. Soc. 216: 337–350. doi:10.1090/s0002-9947-1976-0423361-7. MR 0423361.
- Piecewise linear concordances and isotopies. Memoirs of the AMS. 1974. MR 0365585.
- Millett, Kenneth C. (1969). "Normal structures for locally flat embeddings". Proc. Amer. Math. Soc. 20 (2): 580–584. doi:10.1090/s0002-9939-1969-0246306-3. MR 0246306.
- Millett, Kenneth C. (1969). "Nonsingular sections to Euclidean bundles". Trans. Amer. Math. Soc. 144: 127–143. doi:10.1090/s0002-9947-1969-0253356-4. MR 0253356.
