= Shelly Harvey =

American mathematician

- Education: Rice University
- Scientific career
- Fields: Mathematics
- Workplaces: Rice University
- Doctoral advisor: Tim Cochran

Shelly Lynn Harvey is a professor of Mathematics at Rice University. Her research interests include knot theory, low-dimensional topology, and group theory.

== Early life ==
Harvey grew up in Rancho Cucamonga, California and graduated California Polytechnic State University in 1997. She received her Ph.D. from Rice University in 2002 under the supervision of Tim Cochran. After postdoctoral studies at the University of California, San Diego and the Massachusetts Institute of Technology, she returned to Rice University in 2005 as the first female tenure-track mathematician there.

== Recognitions ==
Harvey was a Sloan Fellow in 2006. In 2012, she became one of the inaugural fellows of the American Mathematical Society.

== Selected publications ==
- Cochran, Tim D.; Harvey, Shelly (2008), "Homology and derived series of groups. II. Dwyer's theorem", Geometry & Topology, 12 (1): 199–232, arXiv:math/0609484, doi:10.2140/gt.2008.12.199, MR 2377249, S2CID 10589479.
- Cochran, Tim D.; Harvey, Shelly; Leidy, Constance (2009), "Knot concordance and higher-order Blanchfield duality", Geometry & Topology, 13 (3): 1419–1482, arXiv:0710.3082, doi:10.2140/gt.2009.13.1419, MR 2496049, S2CID 8072597.
- Cochran, Tim D.; Harvey, Shelly; Leidy, Constance (2011), "Primary decomposition and the fractal nature of knot concordance", Mathematische Annalen, 351 (2): 443–508, arXiv:0906.1373, doi:10.1007/s00208-010-0604-5, MR 2836668, S2CID 7556758.
