= Nathalie Wahl =

Belgian mathematician

Nathalie Wahl (born 1976) is a Belgian mathematician specializing in topology, including algebraic topology, homotopy theory, and geometric topology. She is a professor of mathematics at the University of Copenhagen, where she directs the Copenhagen Center for Geometry and Topology.

== Education and career ==
Wahl was born in Brussels, and earned a license in mathematics in 1998 at the Université libre de Bruxelles, advised by Jean-Paul Doignon. Her undergraduate thesis concerned infinite antimatroids, and she published the same material in 2001 as her first journal paper. She completed a Ph.D. at the University of Oxford in 2001, with a dissertation Ribbon Graphs and Related Operads in algebraic topology supervised by Ulrike Tillmann.

After short-term positions at Northwestern University, Aarhus University, and the University of Chicago, she joined the Department of Mathematical Sciences at the University of Copenhagen in 2006, and was promoted to full professor there in 2010. In 2020 she became Center Leader of the Copenhagen Center for Geometry and Topology.

== Recognition ==
In 2008, Wahl won the Young Elite Researcher Award (Ung Eliteforskerprisen) of the Independent Research Fund Denmark (Danmarks Frie Forskningsfond). In 2016, she was elected to the Danish Academy of Natural Sciences.
