= Søren Galatius =

Danish mathematician

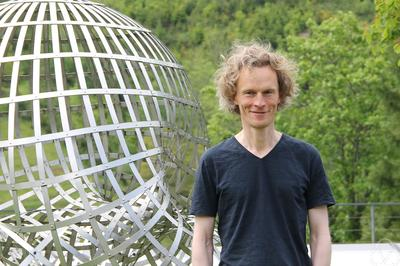
Galatius at Oberwolfach in 2021

Søren Galatius (born 1 August 1976) is a Danish mathematician who works as a professor of mathematics at the Columbia University. He works in algebraic topology, where one of his most important results concerns the homology of the automorphisms of free groups. He is also known for his joint work with Oscar Randal-Williams on moduli spaces of manifolds, comprising several papers.

== Life ==
Galatius was born in Randers, Denmark. He earned his PhD from Aarhus University in 2004 under the supervision of Ib Madsen. He then joined the Stanford University faculty, first with a temporary position as a Szegő Assistant Professor and then two years later with a tenure-track position, eventually becoming full professor in 2011. He relocated to the University of Copenhagen in 2016. Since July 2025, he works as a professor at the Columbia University.

== Recognition ==
In 2010, Galatius won the Silver Medal of the Royal Danish Academy of Sciences and Letters. In 2012, he became one of the inaugural fellows of the American Mathematical Society. He was an invited speaker at the 2014 International Congress of Mathematicians, speaking about his joint work with Oscar Randal-Williams. In 2017, he won an Elite Research Prize from the Danish Government for his work. In 2022 he was awarded the Clay Research Award jointly with Oscar Randal-Williams.

== Selected publications ==
- Galatius, Søren; Tillmann, Ulrike; Madsen, Ib; Weiss, Michael (2009). "The homotopy type of the cobordism category". Acta Mathematica. 202 (2): 195–239. arXiv:math/0605249. doi:10.1007/s11511-009-0036-9. MR 2506750.
- Galatius, Søren (2011). "Stable homology of automorphism groups of free groups". Annals of Mathematics. 173 (2): 705–768. arXiv:math/0610216. doi:10.4007/annals.2011.173.2.3. S2CID 54829457.
- Galatius, Søren; Randal-Williams, Oscar (2018). "Homological stability for moduli spaces of high dimensional manifolds. I". Journal of the American Mathematical Society. 31: 215–268. arXiv:1403.2334. doi:10.1090/jams/884. MR 3718454. S2CID 199452925.
- Galatius, Søren; Randal-Williams, Oscar (2017). "Homological stability for moduli spaces of high dimensional manifolds. II". Annals of Mathematics. 186: 127–204. arXiv:1601.00232. doi:10.4007/annals.2017.186.1.4.
- Galatius, Søren; Randal-Williams, Oscar (2014). "Stable moduli spaces of high-dimensional manifolds". Acta Mathematica. 186 (2): 257–377. arXiv:1201.3527. doi:10.1007/s11511-014-0112-7. S2CID 119170153.
