= Y-homeomorphism =

In mathematics, the y-homeomorphism, or crosscap slide, is a special type of auto-homeomorphism in non-orientable surfaces.

It can be constructed by sliding a Möbius strip included on the surface around an essential 1-sided closed curve until the original position; thus it is necessary that the surfaces have genus greater than one. The projective plane ${\mathbb RP}^2$ has no y-homeomorphism.

== See also ==
- Lickorish–Wallace theorem
