= Ulrike Tillmann =

Mathematician

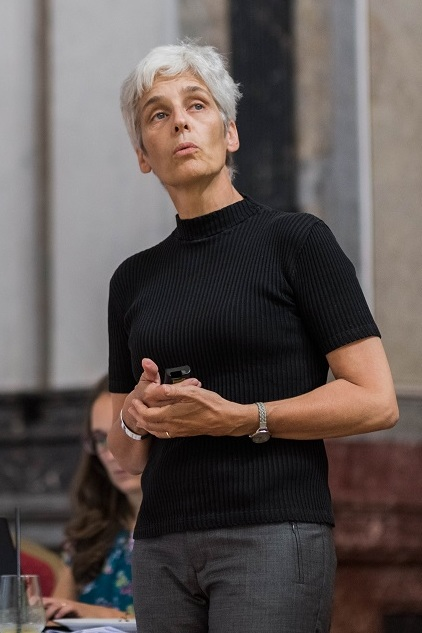
- Born: Ulrike Luise Tillmann; Rhede, Germany
- Education: Brandeis University; Stanford University; University of Bonn
- Spouse: Jonathan Morris
- Children: 3
- Awards: Whitehead Prize (2004)
- Scientific career
- Fields: Mathematics
- Workplaces: University of Oxford
- Thesis: K-Theory of Topological Group Algebras (1990)
- Doctoral advisor: Ralph Cohen
- Doctoral students: Oscar Randal-Williams; Nathalie Wahl
- Website: people.maths.ox.ac.uk/~tillmann/

Ulrike Luise Tillmann FRS is a mathematician specializing in algebraic topology, who has made important contributions to the study of the moduli space of algebraic curves. She was the president of the London Mathematical Society in the period 2021–2022.

She is titular Professor of Mathematics at the University of Oxford and a Fellow of Merton College, Oxford. In 2021 she was appointed Director of the Isaac Newton Institute at the University of Cambridge, and N.M. Rothschild & Sons Professor of Mathematical Sciences at Cambridge, but continued to hold a part-time position at Oxford. In July 2026 she was elected President of the International Mathematical Union.

== Education ==
Tillmann completed her Abitur at Gymnasium Georgianum in Vreden. She received a BA from Brandeis University in 1985, followed by a MA from Stanford University in 1987. She read for a PhD under the supervision of Ralph Cohen at Stanford University, where she was awarded her doctorate in 1990. She was awarded Habilitation in 1996 from the University of Bonn.

== Awards and honours ==
In 2004 she was awarded the Whitehead Prize of the London Mathematical Society.

She was elected a Fellow of the Royal Society in 2008 and a Fellow of the American Mathematical Society in 2013. She has served on the council of the Royal Society and in 2018 was its vice-president. In 2017, she became a member of the German Academy of Sciences Leopoldina.

Tillmann was awarded the Bessel Prize by the Alexander von Humboldt Foundation in 2008 and was the Emmy Noether Lecturer of the German Mathematical Society in 2009.

She was elected as president-designate of the London Mathematical Society in June 2020 and took over the presidency from Jonathan Keating in November 2021. She was elected to the European Academy of Sciences (EURASC) in 2021. In October 2021 she became the director of the Isaac Newton Institute, taking a post which lasts for five years.

== Personal life ==
Tillmann's parents are Ewald and Marie-Luise Tillmann. In 1995 she married Jonathan Morris with whom she has had three daughters.

Tillmann is a member of the Oxford Jewish Congregation. As part of the celebration of the 750th anniversary of the founding of Merton College, she organized a symposium on the history of Merton College and its relationship with Oxford's Jewish community.

== Publications ==
- Tillmann, Ulrike (1997). "On the homotopy of the stable mapping class group". Inventiones Mathematicae. 130 (2): 257–275. Bibcode:1997InMat.130..257T. doi:10.1007/s002220050184. hdl:10338.dmlcz/127120. MR 1474157. S2CID 121645148.
- Madsen, Ib; Tillmann, Ulrike (2001). "The stable mapping class group and $Q(\C{P^{\infty}_+})$". Inventiones Mathematicae. 145 (3): 509–544. doi:10.1007/PL00005807. MR 1856399.
- Galatius, Soren; Madsen, Ib; Tillmann, Ulrike (2006). "Divisibility of the stable Miller-Morita-Mumford classes". Journal of the American Mathematical Society. 19 (4): 759–779. arXiv:math/0701247. doi:10.1090/S0894-0347-06-00523-6. MR 2219303.
- Galatius, Søren; Tillmann, Ulrike; Madsen, Ib; Weiss, Michael (2009). "The homotopy type of the cobordism category". Acta Mathematica. 202 (2): 195–239. arXiv:math/0605249. doi:10.1007/s11511-009-0036-9. MR 2506750.
