= Dehn surgery =

Operation used to modify three-dimensional topological spaces

In topology, a branch of mathematics, a Dehn surgery, named after Max Dehn, is a construction used to modify 3-manifolds. The process takes as input a 3-manifold together with a link. It is often conceptualized as two steps: drilling then filling.

== Definitions ==
- Given a 3-manifold $M$ and a link $L \subset M$, the manifold $M$ drilled along $L$ is obtained by removing an open tubular neighborhood of $L$ from $M$. If $L = L_1\cup\dots\cup L_k$, the drilled manifold has $k$ torus boundary components $T_1\cup\dots\cup T_k$. The manifold $M$ drilled along $L$ is also known as the link complement, since if one removed the corresponding closed tubular neighborhood from $M$, one obtains a manifold diffeomorphic to $M \setminus L$.
- Given a 3-manifold whose boundary is made of 2-tori $T_1\cup\dots\cup T_k$, we may glue in one solid torus by a homeomorphism (resp. diffeomorphism) of its boundary to each of the torus boundary components $T_i$ of the original 3-manifold. There are many inequivalent ways of doing this, in general. This process is called Dehn filling.
- Dehn surgery on a 3-manifold containing a link consists of drilling out a tubular neighbourhood of the link together with Dehn filling on all the components of the boundary corresponding to the link.

In order to describe a Dehn surgery, one picks two oriented simple closed curves $m_i$ and $\ell_i$ on the corresponding boundary torus $T_i$ of the drilled 3-manifold, where $m_i$ is a meridian of $L_i$ (a curve staying in a small ball in $M$ and having linking number +1 with $L_i$ or, equivalently, a curve that bounds a disc that intersects the component $L_i$ once) and $\ell_i$ is a longitude of $T_i$ (a curve travelling once along $L_i$ or, equivalently, a curve on $T_i$ such that the algebraic intersection $\langle\ell_i, m_i\rangle$ is equal to +1). The curves $m_i$ and $\ell_i$ generate the fundamental group of the torus $T_i$, and they form a basis of its first homology group. This gives any simple closed curve $\gamma_i$ on the torus $T_i$ two coordinates $a_i$ and $b_i$, so that $[\gamma_i] = [a_i \ell_i+b_i m_i]$. These coordinates only depend on the homotopy class of $\gamma_i$.

We can specify a homeomorphism of the boundary of a solid torus to $T_i$ by having the meridian curve of the solid torus map to a curve homotopic to $\gamma_i$. As long as the meridian maps to the surgery slope $[\gamma_i]$, the resulting Dehn surgery will yield a 3-manifold that will not depend on the specific gluing (up to homeomorphism). The ratio $b_i/a_i\in\mathbb{Q}\cup\{\infty\}$ is called the surgery coefficient of $L_i$.

In the case of links in the 3-sphere or more generally an oriented integral homology sphere, there is a canonical choice of the longitudes $\ell_i$: every longitude is chosen so that it is null-homologous in the knot complement—equivalently, if it is the boundary of a Seifert surface.

When the ratios $b_i/a_i$ are all integers (note that this condition does not depend on the choice of the longitudes, since it corresponds to the new meridians intersecting the old meridians exactly once), the surgery is called an integral surgery. Such surgeries are closely related to handlebodies, cobordism and Morse functions.

== Examples ==
- If all surgery coefficients are infinite, then each new meridian $\gamma_i$ is homotopic to the old meridian $m_i$. Therefore the homeomorphism-type of the manifold is unchanged by the surgery.
- If $M$ is the 3-sphere, $L$ is the unknot, and the surgery coefficient is $0$, then the surgered 3-manifold is $\mathbb{S}^2\times \mathbb{S}^1$.
- If $M$ is the 3-sphere, $L$ is the unknot, and the surgery coefficient is $b/a$, then the surgered 3-manifold is the lens space $L(b,a)$. In particular if the surgery coefficient is of the form $\pm1/r$, then the surgered 3-manifold is still the 3-sphere.
- If $M$ is the 3-sphere, $L$ is the right-handed trefoil knot, and the surgery coefficient is $+1$, then the surgered 3-manifold is the Poincaré dodecahedral space.

== Results ==
Every closed, orientable, connected 3-manifold is obtained by performing Dehn surgery on a link in the 3-sphere. This result, the Lickorish–Wallace theorem, was first proven by Andrew H. Wallace in 1960 and independently by W. B. R. Lickorish in a stronger form in 1962. Via the now well-known relation between genuine surgery and cobordism, this result is equivalent to the theorem that the oriented cobordism group of 3-manifolds is trivial, a theorem originally proved by Vladimir Abramovich Rokhlin in 1951.

Since orientable 3-manifolds can all be generated by suitably decorated links, one might ask how distinct surgery presentations of a given 3-manifold might be related. The answer is called the Kirby calculus.

== See also ==
- Hyperbolic Dehn surgery
- Tubular neighborhood
- Surgery on manifolds, in the general sense, also called spherical modification.
