= Matthias Kreck =

German mathematician

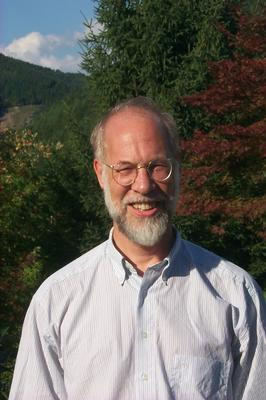
Kreck in Oberwolfach, 2000

Matthias Kreck (born 22 July 1947, in Dillenburg) is a German mathematician who works in the areas of Algebraic Topology and Differential topology. From 1994 to 2002 he was director of the Oberwolfach Research Institute for Mathematics and from October 2006 to September 2011 he was the director of the Hausdorff Center for Mathematics at the University of Bonn, where he is currently a professor.

== Life and work ==
Kreck grew up as the son of the theologian Walter Kreck in Herborn and studied mathematics and physics from 1966 to 1970, and business administration at the Universities of Bonn, Berlin and Regensburg. In 1970 he submitted his diploma in Mathematics in Bonn and in 1972 he received his doctorate there under the supervision of Friedrich Hirzebruch, with a thesis titled An invariant for stably parallelized manifolds. From 1972 to 1976 he studied Protestant theology in Bonn: in a similar period he was also assistant from 1970 to 1976 to professor Hirzebruch. In 1977 he completed his habilitation in Bonn in Mathematics, titled Bordism groups of diffeomorphisms. In 1976 he became professor at the University of Wuppertal and in 1978 he moved to the University of Mainz. From 1994 to 2002 he was director of the Oberwolfach Research Institute for Mathematics. In 1999 he became professor at the University of Heidelberg. From 2007 until October 2011 he was the founding director of the Hausdorff Research Institute for Mathematics at the University of Bonn. In 1981/82 and from 1989 to 1992 he was visiting professor at the Max Planck Institute for Mathematics in Bonn. He was also a guest researcher at places including Paris, Princeton, Berkeley, Chicago, Aarhus, St. Petersburg, Moscow and Beijing.

Kreck worked on the classification of manifolds in differential topology (e.g. bordism groups), 4-manifolds with exotic differentiable structure and the interaction of differential geometry and topology. In his habilitation in 1977 he managed the complete classification of closed smooth manifolds with diffeomorphisms up to bordism: a problem that had already been worked on by René Thom, William Browder and Dennis Sullivan. Building on this work he developed a modified theory of surgery which is applicable under weaker conditions than classical surgery and he applied this theory to solve outstanding questions in differential geometry. In the 2000s (decade), he considered examples of asymmetric topological manifolds, finding the first example of such a manifold with trivial fundamental group.

From 1990 to 1998 he was an editor of Mathematische Annalen and from 1998 to 2002 for Archiv der Mathematik. Since 2000 he has been a member of the Heidelberg Academy of Sciences. In 2003 he was made an honorary doctor of the University of Siegen. In 2010 he was awarded the Cantor Medal. In 2012 the German Mathematical Society awarded him a Gauss Lectureship. In 2023, he was elected as a corresponding member of the Göttingen Academy of Sciences and Humanities.

Among his PhD students is Peter Teichner, presently a Director of the Max Planck Institute for Mathematics in Bonn.

In February 2011 following the Guttenberg plagiarism scandal, he initiated a "declaration of university professors on academic standards" and the accompanying petition. The original signatories included, e.g. Martin Carrier, Eckhard Freise, Gerhard Huisken and Werner Nahm.

In his spare time he plays the cello.

== Publications ==
- Kreck, Matthias (2010). Differential algebraic topology : from stratifolds to exotic spheres. Providence, R.I.: American Mathematical Society. ISBN 978-0-8218-4898-2. OCLC 444109034.
- Kreck, Matthias (1984). Bordism of diffeomorphisms and related topics. Berlin: Springer-Verlag. ISBN 978-3-540-38912-5. OCLC 277186968.
- Exotic structures on 4-manifolds, annual report, DMV, Bd.88, 1986, pp. 124–145
- Kreck, Matthias; Lück, Wolfgang (2005). The Novikov conjecture : geometry and algebra. Basel: Birkhäuser. ISBN 3-7643-7141-2. OCLC 288229257.
- Kreck, Matthias (2010). Differential algebraic topology : from stratifolds to exotic spheres. Providence, R.I.: American Mathematical Society. ISBN 978-0-8218-4898-2. OCLC 444109034.
- Hambleton, Ian; Kreck, Matthias (1988). "On the classification of topological 4-manifolds with finite fundamental group". Mathematische Annalen. 280 (1): 85–104. doi:10.1007/bf01474183. MR 0928299. S2CID 122269475.
- Kreck, Matthias; Lück, Wolfgang; Teichner, Peter (1995). "Counterexamples to the Kneser conjecture in dimension four". Commentarii Mathematici Helvetici. 70 (1): 423–433. doi:10.1007/bf02566016. MR 1340102. S2CID 6538377.
- Kreck, Matthias (1999). "Surgery and duality". Annals of Mathematics. 149 (3): 707–754. arXiv:math/9905211. doi:10.2307/121071. JSTOR 121071. MR 1709301. S2CID 9433330.
