= Lickorish–Wallace theorem =

Characterizes closed, orientable, connected 3-manifolds via Dehn surgery on a 3-sphere

In mathematics, the Lickorish–Wallace theorem in the theory of 3-manifolds states that any closed, orientable, connected 3-manifold may be obtained by performing Dehn surgery on a framed link in the 3-sphere with ±1 surgery coefficients. Furthermore, each component of the link can be assumed to be unknotted.

The theorem was proved in the early 1960s by W. B. R. Lickorish and Andrew H. Wallace, independently and by different methods. Lickorish's proof rested on the Lickorish twist theorem, which states that any orientable automorphism of a closed orientable surface is generated by Dehn twists along 3g − 1 specific simple closed curves in the surface, where g denotes the genus of the surface. Wallace's proof was more general and involved adding handles to the boundary of a higher-dimensional ball.

A corollary of the theorem is that every closed, orientable 3-manifold bounds a simply-connected compact 4-manifold.

By using his work on automorphisms of non-orientable surfaces, Lickorish also showed that every closed, non-orientable, connected 3-manifold is obtained by Dehn surgery on a link in the non-orientable 2-sphere bundle over the circle. Similar to the orientable case, the surgery can be done in a special way which allows the conclusion that every closed, non-orientable 3-manifold bounds a compact 4-manifold.
