= Universal homeomorphism =

In algebraic geometry, a universal homeomorphism is a morphism of schemes $f: X \to Y$ such that, for each morphism $Y' \to Y$, the base change $X \times_Y Y' \to Y'$ is a homeomorphism of topological spaces.

A morphism of schemes is a universal homeomorphism if and only if it is integral, radicial and surjective. In particular, a morphism of locally of finite type is a universal homeomorphism if and only if it is finite, radicial and surjective.

For example, an absolute Frobenius morphism is a universal homeomorphism.
