= Thomas Schick =

German mathematician

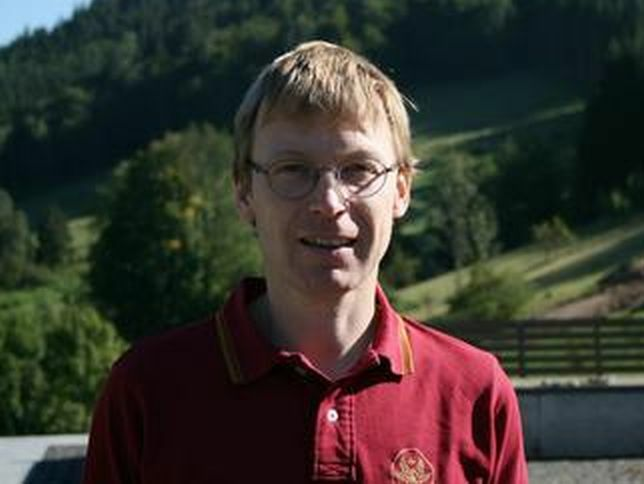
- Schick in Oberwolfach, Germany 2012
- Born: May 22, 1969 (age 57); Alzey, Germany
- Occupation: Mathematician

Thomas Schick (born 22 May 1969 in Alzey) is a German mathematician, specializing in algebraic topology and differential geometry.

== Education and career ==
Schick studied mathematics and physics at the Johannes Gutenberg University Mainz, where he received in 1994 his Diplom in mathematics and in 1996 his PhD (Promotion) under the supervision of Wolfgang Lück with thesis Analysis on Manifolds of Bounded Geometry, Hodge-deRham Isomorphism and $L^2$-Index Theorem. As a postdoc he was from 1996 to 1998 at the University of Münster and from 1998 to 2000 an assistant professor at Pennsylvania State University, where he worked with Nigel Higson and John Roe. Schick received his habilitation in 2000 from the University of Münster and is since 2001 a professor for pure mathematics at the University of Göttingen.

His research deals with topological invariants, e.g. $L^2$-invariants and those invariants which result from the K-theory of operator algebras. Such invariants arise in generalizations of the Atiyah-Singer index theorem.

Schick, with Wolfgang Lück, introduced the strong Atiyah conjecture. Given a discrete group G, the Atiyah conjecture states that the $L^2$-Betti numbers of a finite CW-complex that has fundamental group G are integers, provided that G is torsion-free; furthermore, in the general case, the $L^2$-Betti numbers are rational numbers with denominators determined by the finite subgroups of G. In 2007 Schick, with Peter Linnell, proved a theorem which established conditions under which the Atiyah conjecture for a torsion-free group G implies the Atiyah conjecture for every finite extension of G; furthermore, they proved that the conditions are satisfied for a certain class of groups. In 2000 Schick proved the Atiyah conjecture for a large class of special cases. In 2007 he presented a method which proved the Baum-Connes conjecture for the full braid groups, and for other classes of groups which arise as (finite) extensions for which the Baum-Connes conjecture is known to be true.

In the 1990s there were proofs of many special cases of the Gromov-Lawson-Rosenberg conjecture concerning criteria for the existence of a metric with positive scalar curvature; in 1997 Schick published the first counterexample.

He was the coordinator of the Courant Research Center's Strukturen höherer Ordnung in der Mathematik (Structures of Higher Order in Mathematics) at the University of Göttingen. A major goal of the research center was the investigation of mathematical structures that could play a role in modern theoretical physics, especially string theory and quantum gravity.

He was the managing editor for Mathematische Annalen. In 2014 he was an invited speaker with talk The topology of scalar curvature at the International Congress of Mathematicians in Seoul. In 2016 he became a full member of the Göttingen Academy of Sciences and Humanities.

== Selected publications ==
- Topology of scalar curvature. Proc. ICM 2014, Seoul.
- Operator algebras and topology. ICTP Summer School, Triest 2001.
- with Ulrich Bunke: Differential K-Theory.
- with Ulrich Bunke: Smooth K-Theory. In: Astérisque. No. 328 (2009), 45–135 (2010). ISBN 978-2-85629-289-1.
- with Bernhard Hanke and Wolfgang Steimle: The space of metrics of positive scalar curvature. Publications Mathématiques de l'IHÉS 120 (2014), 335–367. doi:10.1007/s10240-014-0062-9
- with Bernhard Hanke: Enlargeability and index theory. Journal of Differential Geometry 74 (2006), no. 2, 293–320. Arxiv
- with Józef Dodziuk, Peter Linnell, Varghese Mathai, Stuart Yates: Approximating L^{2}-invariants and the Atiyah conjecture. Dedicated to the memory of Jürgen K. Moser. Communications on Pure and Applied Mathematics 56 (2003), no. 7, 839–873. doi:10.1002/cpa.10076
- with Rostislav Grigorchuk, Peter Linnell, Andrzej Żuk: On a question of Atiyah. Comptes rendus de l'Académie des Sciences 331 (2000), no. 9, 663–668. Arxiv
- with Wolfgang Lück: $L^2$ torsion of hyperbolic manifolds of finite volume. In: Geometric and Functional Analysis. vol. 9, 1999, pp. 518–567, Arxiv.
- Integrality of $L^2$ Betti numbers, Mathematische Annalen vol. 317, 2000, pp. 727–750, Arxiv.
- $L^2$-index theorem for elliptic boundary problems, Pacific Journal of Mathematics vol. 197, 2001, pp. 423–439, Arxiv.
