= Michael Weiss (mathematician) =

German mathematician

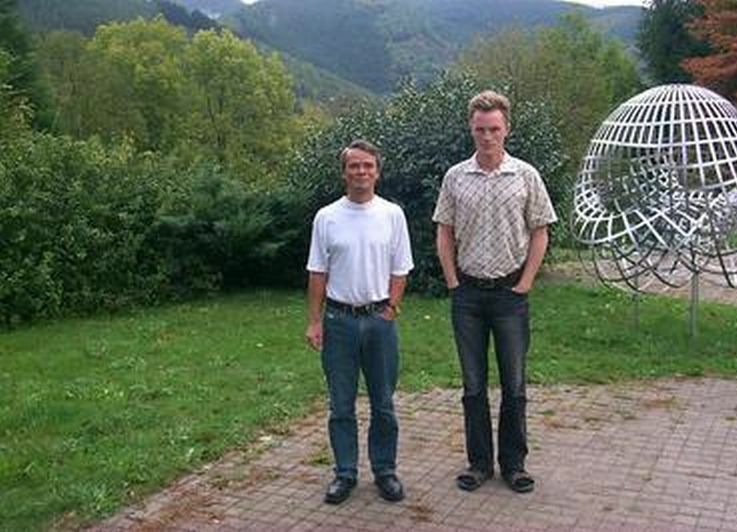
Weiss (left) with Søren Galatius at Oberwolfach, 2003

Michael Weiss (born 14 December 1955) is a German mathematician and an expert in algebraic and geometric topology. He is a professor at the University of Münster.

== Life ==
He completed his PhD in 1982 at the University of Warwick under the supervision of Brian Sanderson. He was then affiliated as a researcher with the Institute of Advanced Scientific Studies near Paris and the universities of Bielefeld, Edinburgh, and Göttingen. In 1999, he joined the faculty of Aberdeen University where he stayed until 2011, when he was awarded a Alexander von Humboldt Professorship at the University of Münster.

== Academic Work ==
His research is on algebraic topology and differential topology. In work with Ib Madsen, he resolved the Mumford Conjecture about rational characteristic classes of surface bundles in the limit as the genus tends to infinity. Building on earlier work of Thomas Goodwillie, he developed Embedding Calculus, a Calculus of functors for embeddings of manifolds.

== Recognition ==
In 2006, he was awarded the Fröhlich Prize of the London Mathematical Society.

== Publications ==
- Madsen, Ib; Weiss, Michael (2007). "The stable moduli space of Riemann surfaces: Mumford's conjecture". Annals of Mathematics. (2). 165 (3): 843–941. arXiv:math/0212321. doi:10.4007/annals.2007.165.843. MR 2335797.
- Galatius, Søren; Tillmann, Ulrike; Madsen, Ib; Weiss, Michael (2009). "The homotopy type of the cobordism category". Acta Mathematica. 202 (2): 195–239. arXiv:math/0605249. doi:10.1007/s11511-009-0036-9. MR 2506750.
