= Lars Hesselholt =

Danish mathematician

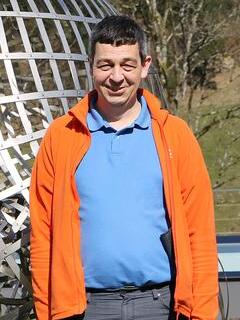
- Hesselholt in Oberwolfach, 2018.
- Born: 1966 (age 59–60); Vejrumbo, Viborg Municipality, Denmark
- Education: Aarhus University
- Awards: Sloan Fellow (1998); AMS Fellow (2013)
- Scientific career
- Fields: Mathematics
- Workplaces: Nagoya University; Massachusetts Institute of Technology
- Thesis: Topological cyclic homology (1994)
- Doctoral advisor: Ib Henning Madsen

Lars Hesselholt (born September 25, 1966) is a Danish mathematician who works as a professor of mathematics at Nagoya University in Japan, as well as holding a temporary position as Niels Bohr Professor at the University of Copenhagen. His research interests include homotopy theory, algebraic K-theory, and arithmetic algebraic geometry.

Hesselholt was born in Vejrumbro, a village in the Viborg Municipality of Denmark. He studied at Aarhus University, earning a bachelor's degree in 1988, a master's degree in 1992, and a Ph.D. in 1994; his dissertation, supervised by Ib Madsen, concerned K-theory. After postdoctoral studies at the Mittag-Leffler Institute, he joined the faculty of the Massachusetts Institute of Technology in 1994 as a C.L.E. Moore instructor, and stayed at MIT as an assistant and then associate professor, before moving to Nagoya in 2008. Hesselholt's wife is Japanese, and when he joined the Nagoya faculty he became the first westerner with a full professorship in mathematics in Japan. He is the managing editor of the Nagoya Mathematical Journal.

Hesselholt became a Sloan fellow in 1998, and was an invited speaker at the International Congress of Mathematicians in 2002. In 2012, he became one of the inaugural fellows of the American Mathematical Society, and a foreign member of the Royal Danish Academy of Sciences and Letters.
