= Topology (journal) =

- Discipline: Topology
- Language: English

Publication details
- History: 1962–2009
- Publisher: Elsevier
- Frequency: Bimonthly
- Impact factor: 0.227 (2011)

Standard abbreviations
- ISO 4: Topology

Indexing
- CODEN: TPLGAF
- ISSN: 0040-9383
- LCCN: 65002707
- OCLC no.: 77547955

Links
- Journal homepage; Online access

Topology was a peer-reviewed mathematical journal covering topology and geometry. It was established in 1962 and since 1994, it was published by Elsevier. The last issue of Topology appeared in 2009.

== Pricing dispute ==
On 10 August 2006, after months of unsuccessful negotiations with Elsevier about the price policy of library subscriptions, the entire editorial board of the journal handed in their resignation, effective 31 December 2006. Subsequently, two more issues appeared in 2007 with papers that had been accepted before the resignation of the editors. In early January the former editors instructed Elsevier to remove their names from the website of the journal, but Elsevier refused to comply, justifying their decision by saying that the editorial board should remain on the journal until all of the papers accepted during its tenure had been published.

In 2007 the former editors of Topology announced the launch of the Journal of Topology, published by Oxford University Press on behalf of the London Mathematical Society at a significantly lower price. Its first issue appeared in January 2008.
