= Dehn twist =

Term in geometric topology

A positive Dehn twist applied to the cylinder modifies the green curve as shown.

In geometric topology, a branch of mathematics, a Dehn twist is a certain type of self-homeomorphism of a surface (two-dimensional manifold).

== Definition ==
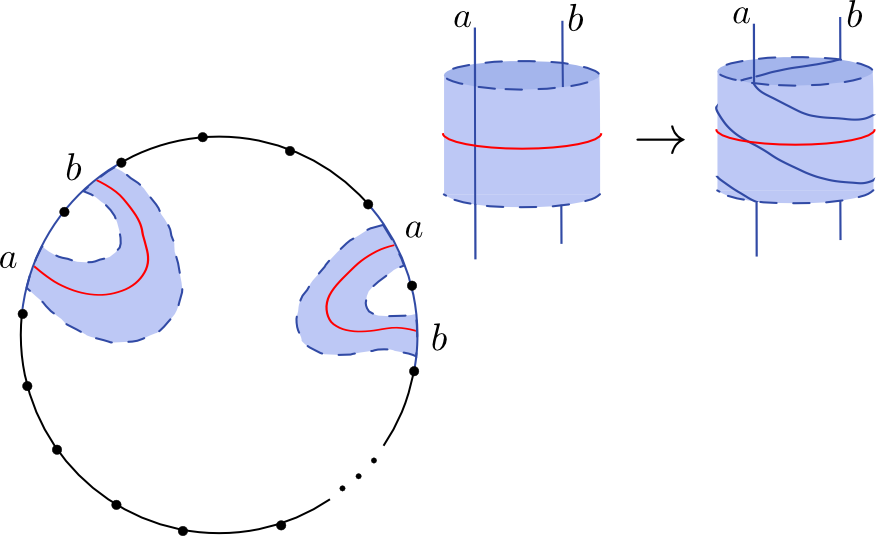
General Dehn twist on a compact surface represented by a n-gon.

Suppose that c is a simple closed curve in a closed, orientable surface S. Let A be a tubular neighborhood of c. Then A is an annulus, homeomorphic to the Cartesian product of a circle and a unit interval I:

$$c \subset A \cong S^1 \times I.$$

Give A coordinates (s, t) where s is a complex number of the form $e^{i\theta}$ with $\theta \in [0, 2\pi],$ and t ∈ [0, 1].

Let f be the map from S to itself which is the identity outside of A and inside A we have

$$f(s, t) = \left(se^{i2\pi t}, t\right).$$

Then f is a Dehn twist about the curve c.

Dehn twists can also be defined on a non-orientable surface S, provided one starts with a 2-sided simple closed curve c on S.

== Example ==
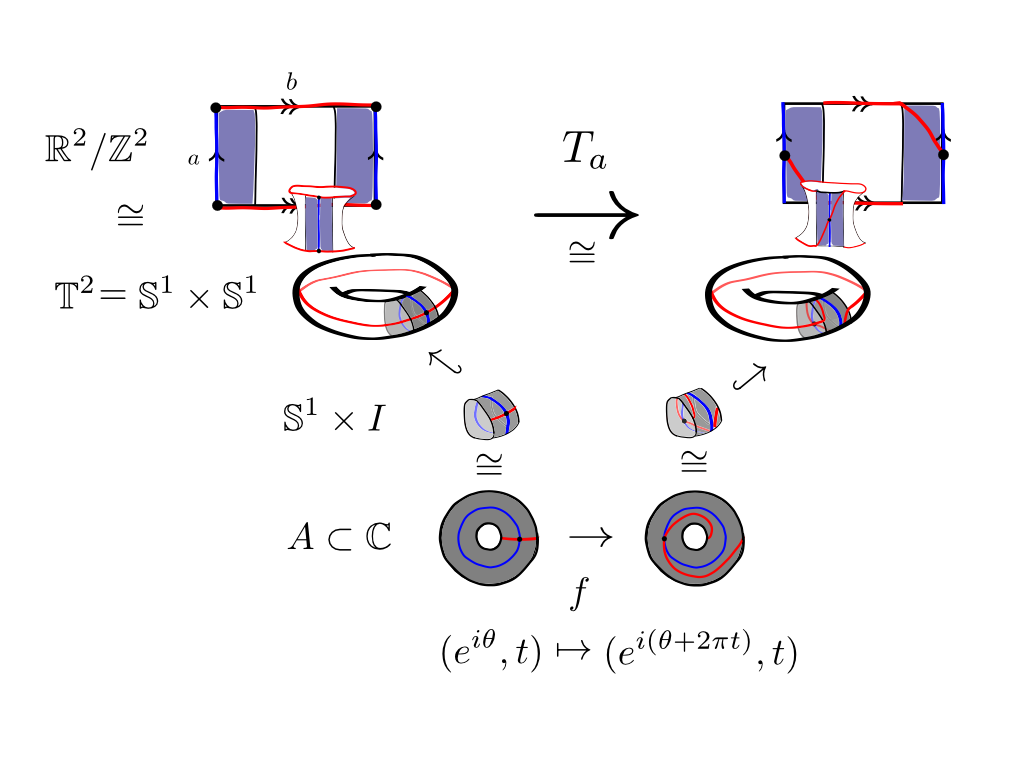
An example of a Dehn twist on the torus, along the closed curve a, in blue, where a is an edge of the fundamental polygon representing the torus.

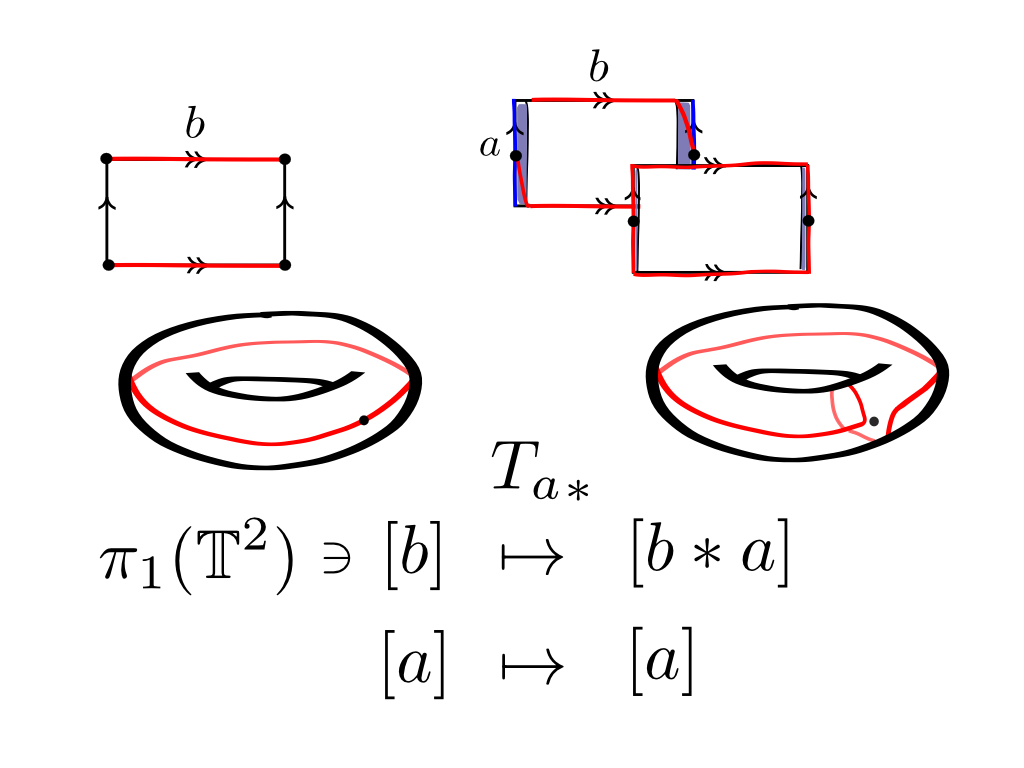
The automorphism on the fundamental group of the torus induced by the self-homeomorphism of the Dehn twist along one of the generators of the torus.

Consider the torus represented by a fundamental polygon with edges a and b

$$\mathbb{T}^2 \cong \mathbb{R}^2/\mathbb{Z}^2.$$

Let a closed curve be the line along the edge a called $\gamma_a$.

Given the choice of gluing homeomorphism in the figure, a tubular neighborhood of the curve $\gamma_a$ will look like a band linked around a doughnut. This neighborhood is homeomorphic to an annulus, say

$$a(0; 0, 1) = \{z \in \mathbb{C}: 0 < |z| < 1\}$$

in the complex plane.

By extending to the torus the twisting map $\left(e^{i\theta}, t\right) \mapsto \left(e^{i\left(\theta + 2\pi t\right)}, t\right)$ of the annulus, through the homeomorphisms of the annulus to an open cylinder to the neighborhood of $\gamma_a$, yields a Dehn twist of the torus by a.

$$T_a: \mathbb{T}^2 \to \mathbb{T}^2$$

This self homeomorphism acts on the closed curve along b. In the tubular neighborhood it takes the curve of b once along the curve of a.

A homeomorphism between topological spaces induces a natural isomorphism between their fundamental groups. Therefore one has an automorphism

$${T_a}_\ast: \pi_1\left(\mathbb{T}^2\right) \to \pi_1\left(\mathbb{T}^2\right): [x] \mapsto \left[T_a(x)\right]$$

where [x] are the homotopy classes of the closed curve x in the torus. Notice ${T_a}_\ast([a]) = [a]$ and ${T_a}_\ast([b]) = [b*a]$, where $b*a$ is the path travelled around b then a.

== Mapping class group ==
The 3g − 1 curves from the twist theorem, shown here for g = 3.

It is a theorem of Max Dehn that maps of this form generate the mapping class group of isotopy classes of orientation-preserving homeomorphisms of any closed, oriented genus-$g$ surface. W. B. R. Lickorish later rediscovered this result with a simpler proof and in addition showed that Dehn twists along $3g - 1$ explicit curves generate the mapping class group (this is called by the punning name "Lickorish twist theorem"); this number was later improved by Stephen P. Humphries to $2g + 1$, for $g > 1$, which he showed was the minimal number.

Lickorish also obtained an analogous result for non-orientable surfaces, which require not only Dehn twists, but also "Y-homeomorphisms."

== See also ==
- Fenchel–Nielsen coordinates
- Lantern relation
