= Joanna Sułkowska =

Polish chemist and physicist

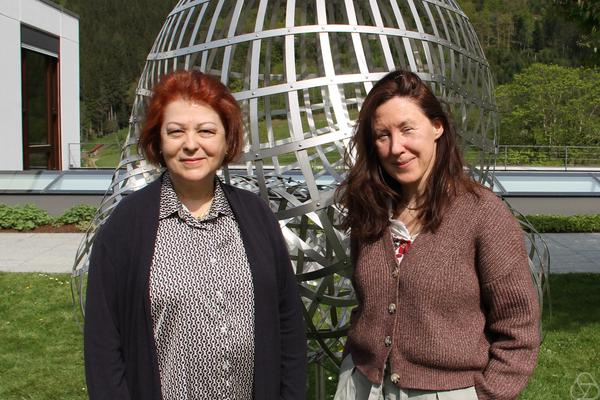
- Sułkowska (right) at Oberwolfach in 2026
- Education: habilitation, doctorate
- Alma mater: University of Warsaw
- Occupation: Chemist
- Employer: Społeczna Akademia Nauk; California Institute of Technology (2019–2019); University of Warsaw

Joanna Ida Sułkowska is a Polish physicist and chemist who specializes in biophysics and protein molecular biophysics and theory. She is an assistant professor in the Faculty of Chemistry and the Center of New Technologies at the University of Warsaw.

== Biography ==
Sułkowska graduated with her PhD in Physics from the University of Warsaw in 2003. She obtained her doctoral degree in 2007 from the Institute of Physics of the Polish Academy of Sciences with a thesis titled Stretching and folding proteins in coarse grained models prepared under her adviser, Professor Marek Cieplak. After her PhD, she worked at the Institute of Physics of the Polish Academy of Sciences as an adjunct (2008-2012) She worked on postdoctoral training at the Center for Theoretical Biological Physics at the University of California, San Diego and was a visiting professor at UCSD and Rice University for the 2012–13 school year. In 2013, she joined the Faculty of Chemistry at the University of Warsaw as an assistant professor and in 2014, she became the head of the Interdisciplinary Laboratory of Biological Systems Modeling research group. She habilitated in 2016 with the Faculty of Chemistry at the University of Warsaw, based on the evaluation of her scientific achievements and her dissertation, Classification and energy landscape of looped proteins: nodes, slipknots, and lassas.

== Awards and publications ==
Sułkowska has published many articles and received multiple rewards for her scientific work. In 2017, she was on the list of International Rising Talents of the L'Oréal Foundation and was among UNESCO's 15 most promising young researchers from around the world. Also that year, she received a Young Investigator Program Grant from the European Molecular Biology Organization (EMBO) for the analysis of protein loops.
