= Peter Teichner =

German mathematician

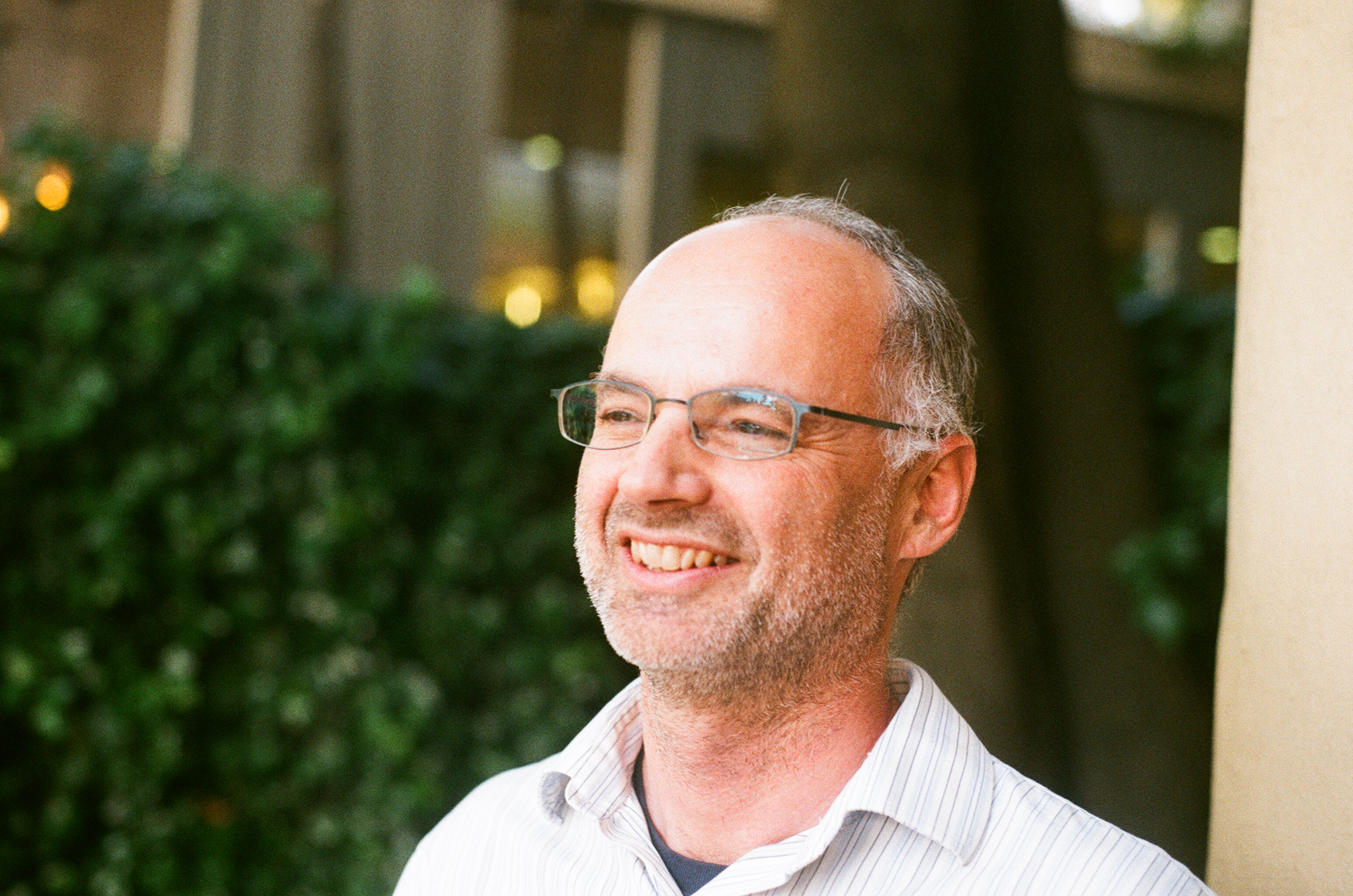
Peter Teichner

Peter Teichner (born June 30, 1963 in Bratislava, Czechoslovakia) is a German mathematician and one of the directors of the Max Planck Institute for Mathematics in Bonn. His main areas of work are topology and geometry.

== Life ==
In 1988, Peter Teichner graduated from the University of Mainz with a degree in mathematics. After graduating, he worked for one year in Canada, funded by the "Government of Canada Award", at McMaster University in Hamilton (Ontario). From 1989 to 1990 he was affiliated with the Max Planck Institute for Mathematics. From 1990 to 1992 he worked at the University of Mainz as a research assistant, and in 1992 he received his doctorate with Matthias Kreck as his advisor. The title of his doctoral thesis was Topological four-manifolds with finite fundamental group.

With a Feodor Lynen Scholarship from the Humboldt Foundation, he went to UC San Diego from 1992 to 1995 and collaborated with Michael Freedman. In 1995 he worked at the Institut des Hautes Études Scientifiques in Bures-sur-Yvette, France. From 1995 to 1996 he was again at the University of Mainz. From 1996 to 1997 he was at UC Berkeley as a Miller Research Fellow. From 1996 he was an associate professor at UC San Diego, and in 1999 he was granted tenure. He stayed at UC San Diego until 2004, since then he has been a full professor at UC Berkeley, where he retired in 2019. He has been a director at the Max Planck Institute for Mathematics in Bonn since 2008. He has also been the managing director from 2011 until 2019.

His students include Arthur Bartels, James Conant, and Christopher Schommer-Pries.

== Academic work ==
Peter Teichner's work lies in the field of topology, which deals with qualitative properties of geometric objects.

His early achievements were on the classification of 4-manifolds. Together with the Fields medalist Mike Freedman, Peter Teichner made contributions to the classification of 4-manifolds whose fundamental group only grows sub-exponentially.

Later in his career, he moved on to study Euclidean and topological field theories. In particular, in an ongoing project, Peter Teichner and Stephan Stolz try to refine the mathematical term quantum field theory in such a way that deformation classes of quantum field theories can be interpreted as a qualitative property of a manifold. More specifically, these should form a cohomology theory. The emerging language should be flexible enough to formulate new physical theories, but also so precise that predictions can be made about the impossibility of certain combinations of space-time and quantum fields. This is known as the Stolz-Teichner program.
