= Ib Madsen =

Danish mathematician

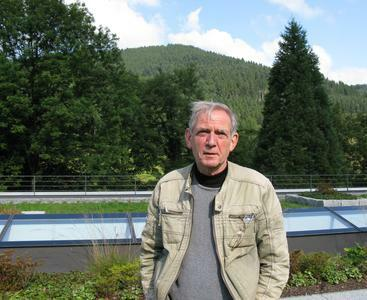
Ib Madsen in Oberwolfach, 2008

Ib Henning Madsen (born 12 April 1942, in Copenhagen) is a Danish mathematician, a professor of mathematics at the University of Copenhagen. He is known for (with Michael Weiss) proving the Mumford conjecture on the cohomology of the stable mapping class group, and for developing topological cyclic homology theory.

== Professional career ==
Madsen earned a candidate degree from the University of Copenhagen in 1965, and a Ph.D. from the University of Chicago in 1970 under the supervision of J. Peter May. In 1971 he took a faculty position at Aarhus University, and he remained there until 2008, when he moved to Copenhagen.

His doctoral students have included Søren Galatius and Lars Hesselholt.

== Awards and honors ==
Madsen was elected as a member of the Royal Danish Academy of Science and Letters in 1978, as a foreign member of the Royal Swedish Academy of Sciences in 1998, and as a foreign member of the Royal Norwegian Society of Sciences and Letters in 2000. In 2012 he became a fellow of the American Mathematical Society.

In 1992, he was awarded the Humboldt Prize. In 2011, he won the Ostrowski Prize for outstanding achievement in pure mathematics, shared with Kannan Soundararajan and David Preiss.

== Publications ==
- Madsen, Ib; Weiss, Michael (2007). "The stable moduli space of Riemann surfaces: Mumford's conjecture". Annals of Mathematics. (2). 165 (3): 843–941. arXiv:math/0212321. doi:10.4007/annals.2007.165.843. MR 2335797.
- Galatius, Søren; Tillmann, Ulrike; Madsen, Ib; Weiss, Michael (2009). "The homotopy type of the cobordism category". Acta Mathematica. 202 (2): 195–239. arXiv:math/0605249. doi:10.1007/s11511-009-0036-9. MR 2506750.
