= Andy Wallace (field hockey) =

British field hockey player

Sport
- Sport: Field hockey
Senior career
Years	Team	Caps	Goals
1978–1981	Southgate	-	-
National team
Years	Team	Caps	Goals
–	Great Britain		-
–	England		-

Andrew J. Wallace (born 1959) is a former hockey international who represented Great Britain and England. He was selected for the 1980 Summer Olympics.

== Biography ==
Wallace played club hockey for Southgate Hockey Club in the Men's England Hockey League and because he was born to Scottish parents was eligible for both England and Scotland. He opted to play for England and before he had even earned an England cap was selected for the Great Britain team for the 1980 Olympic Games in Moscow, but subsequently did not attend due to the boycott.

Wallace subsequently made his England debut and represented England at the 1981 Men's Hockey Champions Trophy in Karachi, Pakistan.
