= W. B. R. Lickorish =

British mathematician (born 1938)

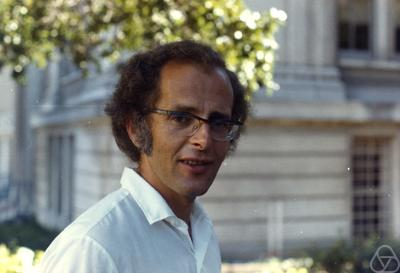
- Lickorish in 1974
- Born: 19 February 1938 (age 88)
- Education: University of Cambridge
- Known for: Lickorish twist theorem Lickorish–Wallace theorem Dehn–Lickorish theorem HOMFLY polynomial
- Awards: Chauvenet Prize (1991); Senior Whitehead Prize (1991); Carl B. Allendoerfer Award (1989)
- Scientific career
- Fields: Mathematician
- Doctoral advisor: Erik Christopher Zeeman
- Doctoral students: Marc Lackenby

William Bernard Raymond Lickorish (born 19 February 1938) is a mathematician. He is emeritus professor of geometric topology in the Department of Pure Mathematics and Mathematical Statistics, University of Cambridge, and also an emeritus fellow of Pembroke College, Cambridge. His research interests include topology and knot theory. He was one of the discoverers of the HOMFLY polynomial invariant of links, and proved the Lickorish-Wallace theorem which states that all closed orientable 3-manifolds can be obtained by Dehn surgery on a link.

== Education ==
Lickorish received his Ph.D. from Cambridge in 1964; his thesis was written under the supervision of Christopher Zeeman.

== Recognition and awards ==
In 1991, Lickorish received the Senior Whitehead Prize from the London Mathematical Society. Lickorish and Kenneth Millett won the 1991 Chauvenet Prize for their paper "The New Polynomial Invariants of Knots and Links". Lickorish was included in the 2019 class of fellows of the American Mathematical Society "for contributions to knot theory and low-dimensional topology".

== Selected publications ==
- Lickorish, W. B. R. (November 1962). "A Representation of Orientable Combinatorial 3-Manifolds". Annals of Mathematics. 76 (3): 531–540. doi:10.2307/1970373. JSTOR 1970373.
- Freyd, Peter; Yetter, David; Hoste, Jim; Lickorish, W.B.R.; Millett, Kenneth; Ocneanu, Adrian (1985). "A New Polynomial Invariant of Knots and Links". Bulletin of the American Mathematical Society. 12 (2): 239–246. doi:10.1090/S0273-0979-1985-15361-3.
- Lickorish, W. B. R. (1997). An Introduction to Knot Theory. Graduate Texts in Mathematics 175. Springer. ISBN 0-387-98254-X.

== See also ==
- Lickorish twist theorem
- Lickorish–Wallace theorem
