= Homeomorphism group =

Group-theoretic concept in topology

In mathematics, particularly topology, the homeomorphism group of a topological space is the group consisting of all homeomorphisms from the space to itself with function composition as the group operation. They are important to the theory of topological spaces, generally exemplary of automorphism groups and topologically invariant in the group isomorphism sense.

== Properties and examples ==
There is a natural group action of the homeomorphism group of a space on that space. Let $X$ be a topological space and denote the homeomorphism group of $X$ by $G$. The action is defined as follows:

$$\begin{align}
G\times X &\longrightarrow X\\
(\varphi, x) &\longmapsto \varphi(x)
\end{align}$$

This is a group action since for all $\varphi,\psi\in G$,

$\varphi\cdot(\psi\cdot x)=\varphi(\psi(x))=(\varphi\circ\psi)(x)$,

where $\cdot$ denotes the group action, and the identity element of $G$ (which is the identity function on $X$) sends points to themselves. If this action is transitive, then the space is said to be homogeneous.

=== Topology ===
As with other sets of maps between topological spaces, the homeomorphism group can be given a topology, such as the compact-open topology. In the case of regular, locally compact space the group multiplication is then continuous.

If the space is compact and Hausdorff, the inversion is continuous as well and $\operatorname{Homeo}(X)$ becomes a topological group. If $X$ is Hausdorff, locally compact, and locally connected this holds as well. Some locally compact separable metric spaces exhibit an inversion map that is not continuous, resulting in $\text{Homeo}(X)$ not forming a topological group.

== Mapping class group ==
In geometric topology especially, one considers the quotient group obtained by quotienting out by isotopy, called the mapping class group:

$${\rm MCG}(X) = {\rm Homeo}(X) / {\rm Homeo}_0(X)$$.

The MCG can also be interpreted as the 0th homotopy group, ${\rm MCG}(X) = \pi_0({\rm Homeo}(X))$. This yields the short exact sequence:

$$1 \rightarrow {\rm Homeo}_0(X) \rightarrow {\rm Homeo}(X) \rightarrow {\rm MCG}(X) \rightarrow 1.$$

In some applications, particularly surfaces, the homeomorphism group is studied via this short exact sequence, and by first studying the mapping class group and group of isotopically trivial homeomorphisms, and then (at times) the extension.

== See also ==
- Mapping class group
