= Mathematische Annalen =

- Discipline: Mathematics
- Language: German, English, French

Publication details
- History: 1869–present
- Publisher: Springer (Germany)
- Frequency: monthly
- Impact factor: 1.8 (2025)

Standard abbreviations
- ISO 4: Math. Ann.

Indexing
- ISSN: 0025-5831 (print); 1432-1807 (web)
- LCCN: 28024764

Links
- Journal homepage

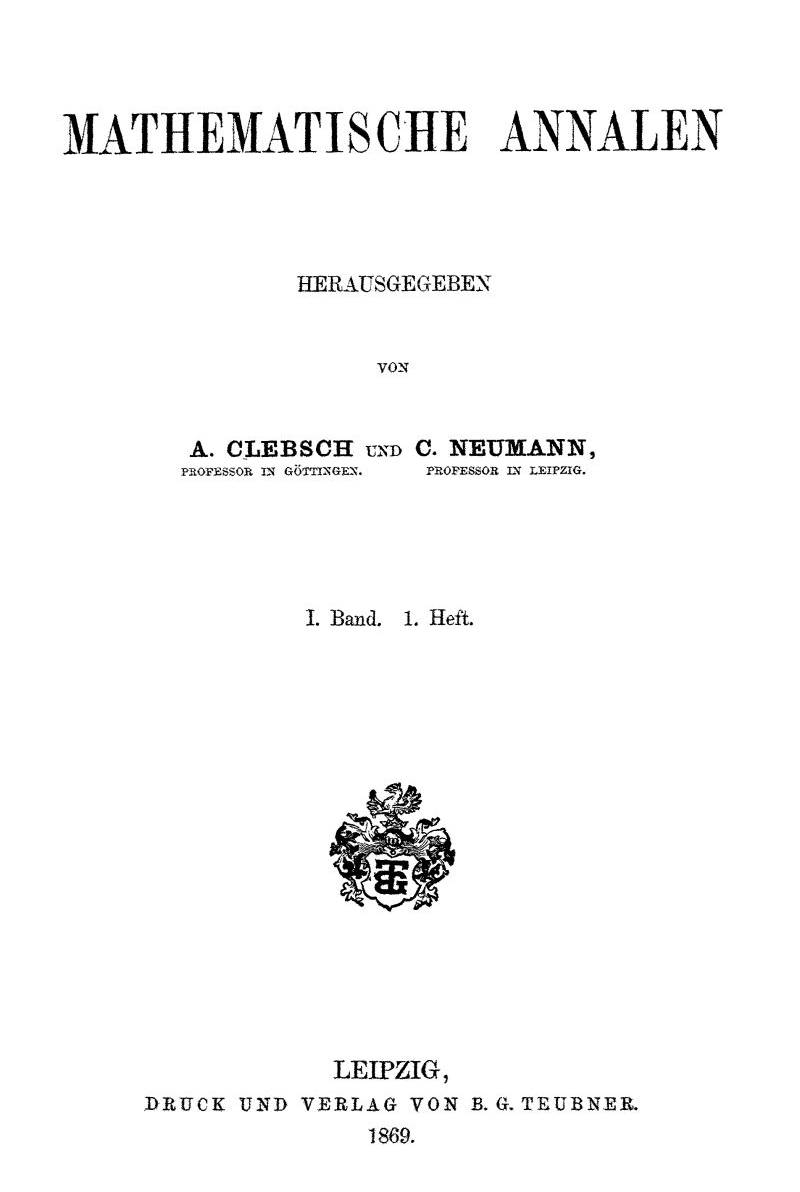
Scan of Book "Mathematische Annalen" from 1869

Mathematische Annalen (abbreviated as Math. Ann. or, formerly, Math. Annal.) is a German mathematical research journal founded in 1868 by Alfred Clebsch and Carl Neumann. Subsequent managing editors were Felix Klein, David Hilbert, Otto Blumenthal, Erich Hecke, Heinrich Behnke, Hans Grauert, Heinz Bauer, Herbert Amann, Jean-Pierre Bourguignon, Wolfgang Lück, Nigel Hitchin, and Thomas Schick. Currently, the managing editor of Mathematische Annalen is Yoshikazu Giga (University of Tokyo).

Volumes 1–80 (1869–1919) were published by Teubner. Since 1920 (vol. 81), the journal has been published by Springer. In the late 1920s, under the editorship of Hilbert, the journal became embroiled in controversy over the participation of L. E. J. Brouwer on its editorial board, a spillover from the foundational Brouwer–Hilbert controversy. Between 1945 and 1947, the journal briefly ceased publication.
