= Oscar Randal-Williams =

British mathematician

- Awards: Whitehead Prize (2017); Leverhulme Prize (2017); Dannie Heineman Prize (2019); Oberwolfach Prize (2019); Clay Research Award (2022)

Academic background
- Education: University of Oxford
- Thesis: Stable moduli spaces of manifolds (2009)
- Doctoral advisor: Ulrike Tillmann

Academic work
- Discipline: Mathematician
- Institutions: University of Cambridge
- Website: www.dpmms.cam.ac.uk/~or257/

Oscar Randal-Williams FRS is a British mathematician and professor at the University of Cambridge, working in topology.

== Career ==
Randal-Williams studied mathematics at the University of Oxford (MMath 2006, DPhil 2009), where he wrote his doctoral thesis Stable moduli spaces of manifolds under the supervision of Ulrike Tillmann. Since 2012 he has been at the University of Cambridge, since 2017 as reader, since 2020 as professor, and since 2024 as the Sadleirian Professor of Pure Mathematics.

In joint work with Søren Galatius, he studied moduli spaces of manifolds, leading to a sequence of papers about which his coauthor talked at the ICM 2014.

== Awards and honours ==
In 2017 Randal-Williams received a Whitehead Prize from the London Mathematical Society and a Philip Leverhulme Prize. In 2018 he was awarded an ERC Starting Grant, and in 2019 the Dannie Heineman Prize of the Göttingen Academy of Sciences and Humanities and the Oberwolfach Prize. In 2022 he was awarded the Clay Research Award jointly with Søren Galatius, and spoke at the ICM. In 2024 he was elected a Fellow of the Royal Society.

== Selected publications ==
- Botvinnik, Boris; Ebert, Johannes; Randal-Williams, Oscar (14 February 2017). "Infinite loop spaces and positive scalar curvature". Inventiones Mathematicae. 209 (3). Springer Science and Business Media LLC: 749–835. arXiv:1411.7408. Bibcode:2017InMat.209..749B. doi:10.1007/s00222-017-0719-3. ISSN 0020-9910. S2CID 55349429.
- Galatius, Søren; Randal-Williams, Oscar (2014). "Stable moduli spaces of high-dimensional manifolds". Acta Mathematica. 212 (2). International Press of Boston: 257–377. arXiv:1201.3527. doi:10.1007/s11511-014-0112-7. ISSN 0001-5962. S2CID 119170153.
- Galatius, Søren; Randal-Williams, Oscar (1 July 2017). "Homological stability for moduli spaces of high dimensional manifolds. II". Annals of Mathematics. 186 (1). arXiv:1601.00232. doi:10.4007/annals.2017.186.1.4. ISSN 0003-486X.
