= Andrew H. Wallace =

Scottish-American mathematician

Andrew Hugh Wallace (1926 – 18 January 2008) was a Scottish-American mathematician.

== Biography ==
Andrew Hugh Wallace was born and raised in Edinburgh, Scotland. He received in 1946 an MA in mathematics from Edinburgh University and in 1949 a PhD from St. Andrews University with thesis Rational integral functions and associated linear transformations. In the 1950s he was an assistant professor of mathematics at the University of Toronto in Canada. In 1959 he became a professor at Indiana University's mathematics department, where he was also department chair. In 1965 he left Indiana to become a mathematics professor at the University of Pennsylvania, where he remained until his retirement as professor emeritus in 1986. For the academic year 1964–1965 and the first five months of 1968 he was a visiting scholar at the Institute for Advanced Study.

Colleagues said his mathematical work was mainly concentrated in topology where he produced fundamental results reported on principally in his series of papers entitled "Modifications and Cobounding Manifolds." Here, he essentially settled in dimensions 5 and higher, the basic open problem regarding these geometric objects, though he did not push his results to an explicit statement of the solution. This was done by an independent method and almost simultaneously by Dr. Stephen Smale ... Dr. Wallace's work in the topology of three dimensional spaces was groundbreaking and remains frequently cited and used to the present day.

In addition to his work in mathematics, Andrew Wallace was an accomplished pianist, dancer, painter, and sailor. His greatest passion during his later life was sailing. He maintained a 35-foot craft. After his retirement, he and a small crew sailed his boat across the Atlantic and Mediterranean to his new home in Crete. He lived in Crete with his second wife Dimitra until he died in 2008.

Upon his death he was survived by his first wife, Angela Wallace (now Angela Kern) and three daughters: Linda Kipp, Susan George, and Corinne Summers. He was also survived by his second wife, Dimitra Chilari and a step-daughter, Irene Chilari. His name is attached to the Lickorish-Wallace theorem.

== Selected publication ==
=== Articles ===
- Wallace, Andrew H. (1952). "Invariant matrices and the Gordan-Capelli series". Proceedings of the London Mathematical Society. 3 (1): 98–127. doi:10.1112/plms/s3-2.1.98.
- Wallace, Andrew H. (1953). "A note on the Capelli operators associated with a symmetric matrix". Proceedings of the Edinburgh Mathematical Society. Series 2. 9 (1): 7–12. doi:10.1017/s0013091500013961.
- Wallace, Andrew H. (1956). "Tangency and duality over arbitrary fields". Proceedings of the London Mathematical Society. 3 (3): 321–342. doi:10.1112/plms/s3-6.3.321.
- Wallace, Andrew H. (1956). "On the homology theory of algebraic varieties, I". Annals of Mathematics. 63 (2): 248–271. doi:10.2307/1969608. JSTOR 1969608.
- Wallace, Andrew H. (1960). "Modifications and cobounding manifolds". Can. J. Math. 12: 503–528. doi:10.4153/CJM-1960-045-7.
- "Modifications and cobounding manifolds. 2". Journal of Mathematics and Mechanics. 10 (5): 773–809. 1961.
- Wallace, Andrew H. (1962). "A geometric method in differential topology". Bull. Amer. Math. Soc. 68 (6): 533–542. doi:10.1090/s0002-9904-1962-10831-3. MR 0142127.

=== Books ===
- An introduction to algebraic topology. NY: Pergamon Press. 1957.
- Homology theory on algebraic varieties. NY: Pergamon Press. 1958. reprint. Dover. 2015.
- Differential topology: first steps. NY: W. H. Benjamin. 1968. ISBN 9780805394856. reprint. Dover. 2006.
- Algebraic topology: homology and cohomology. NY: W. H. Benjamin. 1970. reprint. Dover. 2007.
