= Wolfgang Lück =

German mathematician

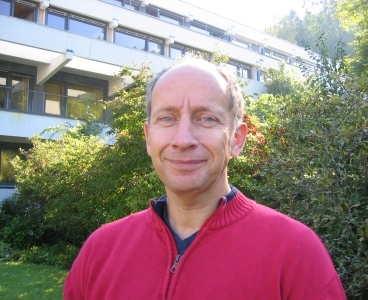
Lück at Oberwolfach, 2006

Wolfgang Lück (born 19 February 1957 in Herford) is a German mathematician who is an internationally recognized expert in algebraic topology.

== Life and work ==
After receiving his Abitur from the Ravensberger Gymnasium in Herford in 1975, he studied at the University of Göttingen where he obtained his Diplom in 1981 and his doctoral degree under Tammo tom Dieck in 1984. His thesis was entitled Eine allgemeine Beschreibung für Faserungen auf projektiven Klassengruppen und Whiteheadgruppen.

From 1982 on he was research assistant and from 1985 on he was assistant in Göttingen. In 1989 Lück received his Habilitation. From 1990 to 1991, he was associate professor at the University of Kentucky in Lexington. From 1991 until 1996, he was professor at the University of Mainz, and from 1996 until 2010 he taught at the University of Münster. Since 2010 he has been a professor at the University of Bonn. In 2003, he was awarded the Max Planck Research Award, in 2008 the Gottfried Wilhelm Leibniz Prize, and in 2025 the von Staudt Prize.

Lück has made significant contributions in topology; he and his coauthors resolved many cases of the Farrell-Jones conjecture and the Borel conjecture. He has also contributed to the development of the theory of L^{2}-invariants (such as L^{2}-Betti numbers and L^{2}-cohomology) of manifolds, which were originally introduced by Michael Atiyah and are defined by means of operator algebras. These invariants have applications in group theory and geometry.

In 2009 and 2010 Lück was president of the German Mathematical Society, whose vice president he had been since 2006. From 2011 until 2017, he was Director of the Hausdorff Research Institute for Mathematics (HIM) in Bonn. In 2012, he became a fellow of the American Mathematical Society. From October 2019 to September 2022, he was spokesperson for the Hausdorff Center for Mathematics (HCM) in Bonn.

His doctoral students include Thomas Schick.

== Selected publications ==
- Lück, Wolfgang (1989). Transformation groups and algebraic K-theory. Berlin New York: Springer-Verlag. ISBN 978-3-540-51846-4. OCLC 20860359.
- Lück, Wolfgang (2002). L2-Invariants: Theory and Applications to Geometry and K-Theory. Berlin, Heidelberg: Springer Berlin Heidelberg. ISBN 978-3-642-07810-1. OCLC 851363662.
- Kreck, Matthias (2005). The Novikov conjecture : geometry and algebra. Basel Boston: Birkhäuser. ISBN 978-3-7643-7315-3. OCLC 288229257.
- Algebraische Topologie Homologie und Mannigfaltigkeiten (in German). Wiesbaden: Vieweg+Teubner Verlag. 2005. ISBN 978-3-322-80241-5. OCLC 863857084.
- L^{2} Invarianten von Mannigfaltigkeiten und Gruppen, Jahresbericht DMV, Bd.99, 1997, Heft 3
- Lück, Wolfgang (2001). "L2-Invariants and Their Applications to Geometry, Group Theory and Spectral Theory". Mathematics Unlimited — 2001 and Beyond. Berlin, Heidelberg: Springer Berlin Heidelberg. pp. 859–871. doi:10.1007/978-3-642-56478-9_42. ISBN 978-3-642-63114-6.
- Editor together with F. Thomas Farrell and Lothar Göttsche: Topology of high-dimensional manifolds, ICTP Lecture Notes, 2002
- Kreck, Matthias; Lück, Wolfgang; Teichner, Peter (1995). "Counterexamples to the Kneser conjecture in dimension four". Commentarii Mathematici Helvetici. 70 (1): 423–433. doi:10.1007/bf02566016. MR 1340102. S2CID 6538377.
