= Surface bundle =

Bundle in which the fiber is a surface

In mathematics, a surface bundle is a bundle in which the fiber is a surface. When the base space is a circle the total space is three-dimensional and is often called a surface bundle over the circle.

== See also ==
- Mapping torus
