= Hilbert–Kunz function =

In algebra, the Hilbert–Kunz function of a local ring (R, m) of prime characteristic p is the function

$$f(q) = \operatorname{length}_R(R/m^{[q]})$$

where q is a power of p and m^{[q]} is the ideal generated by the q-th powers of elements of the maximal ideal m.

The notion was introduced by Ernst Kunz, who used it to characterize a regular ring as a Noetherian ring in which the Frobenius morphism is flat. If d is the dimension of the local ring, Monsky showed that f(q)/(q^d) is c+O(1/q) for some real constant c. This constant, the "Hilbert-Kunz multiplicity", is greater than or equal to 1. Watanabe and Yoshida strengthened some of Kunz's results, showing that in the unmixed case, the ring is regular precisely when c=1.

Hilbert–Kunz functions and multiplicities have been studied for their own sake. Brenner and Trivedi have treated local rings coming from the homogeneous co-ordinate rings of smooth projective curves, using techniques from algebraic geometry. Han, Monsky, and Teixeira have treated diagonal hypersurfaces and various related hypersurfaces. But there is no known technique for determining the Hilbert–Kunz function or c in general. In particular the question of whether c is always rational wasn't settled until recently (by Brenner—it needn't be, and indeed can be transcendental). Hochster and Huneke related Hilbert-Kunz multiplicities to "tight closure" and Brenner and Monsky used Hilbert–Kunz functions to show that localization need not preserve tight closure. The question of how c behaves as the characteristic goes to infinity (say for a hypersurface defined by a polynomial with integer coefficients) has also received attention; once again open questions abound.

A comprehensive overview is to be found in Craig Huneke's article "Hilbert-Kunz multiplicities and the F-signature" arXiv:1409.0467. This article is also found on pages 485-525 of the Springer volume "Commutative Algebra: Expository Papers Dedicated to David Eisenbud on the Occasion of His 65th Birthday", edited by Irena Peeva.

== Bibliography ==
- E. Kunz, "On noetherian rings of characteristic p," Am. J. Math, 98, (1976), 999–1013. 1
- Edward Miller, Lance; Swanson, Irena (2012). "Hilbert-Kunz functions of 2 x 2 determinantal rings". arXiv:1206.1015 [math.AC].
