= Karen E. Smith =

American mathematician

- Born: 1965 (age 60–61); Red Bank, New Jersey
- Education: University of Michigan (Ph.D.); Princeton University
- Awards: Ruth Lyttle Satter Prize in Mathematics (2001); Elected to US National Academy of Sciences (2019); Elected to American Academy of Arts and Sciences (2021)
- Scientific career
- Fields: Mathematics
- Workplaces: University of Michigan
- Thesis: Tight Closure of Parameter Ideals and F-Rationality (1993)
- Doctoral advisor: Mel Hochster
- Doctoral students: Chelsea Walton

Karen Ellen Smith (born 1965 in Red Bank, New Jersey) is an American mathematician, specializing in commutative algebra and algebraic geometry. She completed her bachelor's degree in mathematics at Princeton University before earning her PhD in mathematics at the University of Michigan in 1993. Currently she is the Keeler Professor of Mathematics at the University of Michigan. In addition to being a researcher in algebraic geometry and commutative algebra, Smith with others wrote the textbook An Invitation to Algebraic Geometry.

== Biography ==
Smith graduated in 1987 with a bachelor's degree in mathematics from Princeton University, where she was influenced in her freshman year by Charles Fefferman. She was a high school mathematics teacher in the academic year 1987/1988. In 1988 she became a graduate student at the University of Michigan, where in 1993 she earned her PhD with thesis Tight closure of parameter ideals and f-rationality under the supervision of Melvin Hochster. In the academic year 1993–1994 she was a postdoc at Purdue University working with Craig Huneke. In 1994 she became a C.L.E. Moore Instructor and then an associate professor at MIT. Since 1997 she has been a professor at the University of Michigan.

In 1991 she married the Finnish mathematician Juha Heinonen. He died in 2007.

== Honors ==
In 2001 Smith won the Ruth Lyttle Satter Prize in Mathematics for her development of tight closure methods, introduced by Hochster and Huneke, in commutative algebra and her application of these methods in algebraic geometry. The prize committee specifically cited her papers "Tight closure of parameter ideals" (Inventiones Mathematicae 1994), "F-rational rings have rational singularities" (American J. Math. 1997, and, with Gennady Lyubeznik, "Weak and strong F-regularity are equivalent in graded rings" (American J. Math., 1999).

In addition to the Satter Prize, Smith was the recipient of a 1997 Sloan Research Fellowship, a Fulbright award, and a University of Michigan Faculty Recognition Award for outstanding contributions as a teacher, scholar and member of the University community.

In 1996, Smith was the first recipient of the Etta Z. Falconer Award, where she presented the lecture "Calclulus mod p."

Smith was selected to give the 2015 Earle Raymond Hedrick Lectures at the Mathematical Association of America's MathFest. Smith was chosen to give the Association for Women in Mathematics-American Mathematical Society 2016 Noether Lecture at the Joint Mathematics Meetings.

In 2015 she was elected as a fellow of the American Mathematical Society "for contributions to commutative algebra and algebraic geometry." She was named MSRI Clay Senior Scholar for 2012-2013. In 2019, she was elected to the National Academy of Sciences. The Association for Women in Mathematics has included her in the 2020 class of AWM Fellows for "her tireless support of women in mathematics; throughout her career, she has officially and unofficially mentored numerous female mathematicians at every level from undergraduate to full professor; she continues to be an incredibly strong role model for women everywhere". She was elected to the American Academy of Arts and Sciences in 2021.

== Books ==
- An Invitation to Algebraic Geometry (with Lauri Kahanpää, Pekka Kekäläinen, and William Traves, Universitext, Springer, 2000 and 2004).
- Rational and Nearly Rational Varieties (with János Kollár and Alessio Corti, Cambridge Studies in Advanced Mathematics 92, Cambridge University Press, 2004).
