= Monomial conjecture =

In commutative algebra, a field of mathematics, the monomial conjecture of Melvin Hochster says the following:

Let A be a Noetherian local ring of Krull dimension d and let x_{1}, ..., x_{d} be a system of parameters for A (so that A/(x_{1}, ..., x_{d}) is an Artinian ring). Then for all positive integers t, we have

$$x_1^t \cdots x_d^t \not\in (x_1^{t+1},\dots,x_d^{t+1}). \,$$

The statement can be relatively easily shown in characteristic zero.

== See also ==
- Homological conjectures in commutative algebra
