= Ruth Lyttle Satter Prize in Mathematics =

Mathematics prize

- Awarded for: outstanding contribution to mathematics research by a woman in the previous six years
- Presented by: American Mathematical Society
- Reward: $5,000
- First award: 1991
- Currently held by: Ana Caraiani (2025)
- Website: www.ams.org/profession/prizes-awards/ams-prizes/satter-prize

The Ruth Lyttle Satter Prize in Mathematics, also called the Satter Prize, is one of twenty-one prizes given out by the American Mathematical Society (AMS). It is presented biennially in recognition of a contribution to mathematics research by a woman in the previous six years. The award was funded in 1990 using a donation from Joan Birman, in memory of her sister, Ruth Lyttle Satter, who worked primarily in biological sciences, and was a proponent for equal opportunities for women in science. First awarded in 1991, the award is intended to "honor [Satter's] commitment to research and to encourage women in science". The winner is selected by the council of the AMS, based on the recommendation of a selection committee.

== Award details and history ==
The prize is awarded at the Joint Mathematics Meetings during odd numbered years, and has always carried a modest cash reward. Since 2003, the prize has been $5,000, while from 1997 to 2001, the prize came with $1,200, and $4,000 prior to that. If a joint award is given, the prize money is split between the recipients.

Dusa McDuff was the first recipient of the award, for her work on symplectic geometry. A joint award was given for the first time in 2001, when Karen E. Smith and Sijue Wu shared the award. The 2013 prize winner was Maryam Mirzakhani, who, the following year, became the first woman to be awarded the Fields Medal, which is considered to be the highest honor a mathematician can receive. She won both awards for her work on "the geometry of Riemann surfaces and their moduli spaces". The most recent winner is Ana Caraiani, who was awarded the prize in 2025 "for contributions to arithmetic geometry and number theory: in particular, the Langlands program.".

== Recipients ==
Satter Prize recipients and rationale
Year	Image	Recipient	Rationale
1991	Dusa McDuff	Dusa McDuff	"for her outstanding work during the past five years on symplectic geometry"
1993	Lai-Sang Young	Lai-Sang Young	"for her leading role in the investigation of the statistical (or ergodic) properties of dynamical systems"
1995	Sun-Yung Alice Chang	Sun-Yung Alice Chang	"for her deep contributions to the study of partial differential equations on Riemannian manifolds and in particular for her work on extremal problems in spectral geometry and the compactness of isospectral metrics within a fixed conformal class on a compact 3-manifold"
1997	Ingrid Daubechies	Ingrid Daubechies	"for her deep and beautiful analysis of wavelets and their applications"
1999		Bernadette Perrin-Riou	"for her number theoretical research on p-adic L-functions and Iwasawa theory"
2001		Karen E. Smith	"for her outstanding work in commutative algebra"
2001	Sijue Wu	Sijue Wu	"for her work on a long-standing problem in the water wave equation"
2003	Abigail Thompson	Abigail Thompson	"for her outstanding work in 3-dimensional topology"
2005	Svetlana Jitomirskaya	Svetlana Jitomirskaya	"for her pioneering work on non-perturbative quasiperiodic localization, in particular for results in her papers (1) Metal–insulator transition for the almost Mathieu operator, Ann. of Math. (2) 150 (1999), no. 3, 1159–1175, and (2) with J. Bourgain, Absolutely continuous spectrum for 1D quasiperiodic operators, Invent. Math. 148 (2002), no. 3, 453–463"
2007	Claire Voisin	Claire Voisin	"for her deep contributions to algebraic geometry, and in particular for her recent solutions to two long-standing open problems: the Kodaira problem (On the homotopy types of compact Kähler and complex projective manifolds, Inventiones Mathematicae, 157 (2004), no. 2, 329–343) and Green's conjecture (Green's canonical syzygy conjecture for generic curves of odd genus, Compositio Mathematica, 141 (2005), no. 5, 1163–1190; and Green's generic syzygy conjecture for curves of even genus lying on a K3 surface, Journal of the European Mathematical Society, 4 (2002), no. 4, 363–404)"
2009	Laure Saint-Raymond	Laure Saint-Raymond	"for her fundamental work on the hydrodynamic limits of the Boltzmann equation in the kinetic theory of gases"
2011		Amie Wilkinson	"for her remarkable contributions to the field of ergodic theory of partially hyperbolic dynamical systems"
2013	Maryam Mirzakhani	Maryam Mirzakhani	"for her deep contributions to the theory of moduli spaces of Riemann surfaces"
2015	Hee Oh	Hee Oh	"for her fundamental contributions to the fields of dynamics on homogeneous spaces, discrete subgroups of Lie groups, and applications to number theory"
2017		Laura DeMarco	"for her fundamental contributions to complex dynamics, potential theory, and the emerging field of arithmetic dynamics"
2019		Maryna Viazovska	"for her groundbreaking work in discrete geometry and her spectacular solution to the sphere-packing problem in dimension eight."
2021		Kaisa Matomäki	"for her work (much of it joint with Maksym Radziwiłł) opening up the field of multiplicative functions in short intervals in a completely unexpected and very fruitful way..."
2023		Panagiota Daskalopoulos	"for groundbreaking work in the study of ancient solutions to geometric evolution equations"
2023		Nataša Šešum	"for groundbreaking work in the study of ancient solutions to geometric evolution equations"
2025		Ana Caraiani	"for contributions to arithmetic geometry and number theory: in particular, the Langlands program."

== See also ==
- List of mathematics awards
