= Intersection number =

Generalized notion of counting curve intersections

In mathematics, and especially in algebraic geometry, the intersection number generalizes the intuitive notion of counting the number of times two curves intersect to higher dimensions, multiple (more than 2) curves, and accounting properly for tangency. One needs a definition of intersection number in order to state results like Bézout's theorem.

The intersection number is obvious in certain cases, such as the intersection of the x- and y-axes in a plane, which should be one. The complexity enters when calculating intersections at points of tangency, and intersections which are not just points, but have higher dimension. For example, if a plane is tangent to a surface along a line, the intersection number along the line should be at least two. These questions are discussed systematically in intersection theory.

== Definition for Riemann surfaces ==
Let X be a Riemann surface. Then the intersection number of two closed curves on X has a simple definition in terms of an integral. For every closed curve c on X (i.e., smooth function $c : S^1 \to X$), we can associate a differential form $\eta_c$ of compact support, the Poincaré dual of c, with the property that integrals along c can be calculated by integrals over X:

$\int_c \alpha = -\iint_X \alpha \wedge \eta_c = (\alpha, *\eta_c)$, for every closed (1-)differential $\alpha$ on X,

where $\wedge$ is the wedge product of differentials, and $*$ is the Hodge star. Then the intersection number of two closed curves, a and b, on X is defined as

$$a \cdot b := \iint_X \eta_a \wedge \eta_b = (\eta_a, -*\eta_b) = -\int_b \eta_a$$.

The $\eta_c$ have an intuitive definition as follows. They are a sort of dirac delta along the curve c, accomplished by taking the differential of a unit step function that drops from 1 to 0 across c. More formally, we begin by defining for a simple closed curve c on X, a function f_{c} by letting $\Omega$ be a small strip around c in the shape of an annulus. Name the left and right parts of $\Omega \setminus c$ as $\Omega^{+}$ and $\Omega^{-}$. Then take a smaller sub-strip around c, $\Omega_0$, with left and right parts $\Omega_0^{-}$ and $\Omega_0^{+}$. Then define f_{c} by

$$f_c(x) = \begin{cases} 1, & x \in \Omega_0^{-} \\ 0, & x \in X \setminus \Omega^{-} \\ \mbox{smooth interpolation}, & x \in \Omega^{-} \setminus \Omega_0^{-} \end{cases}$$.

The definition is then expanded to arbitrary closed curves. Every closed curve c on X is homologous to $\sum_{i=1}^N k_i c_i$ for some simple closed curves c_{i}, that is,

$\int_c \omega = \int_{\sum_i k_i c_i} \omega = \sum_{i=1}^N k_i \int_{c_i} \omega$, for every differential $\omega$.

Define the $\eta_c$ by

$$\eta_c = \sum_{i=1}^N k_i \eta_{c_i}$$.

== Definition for algebraic varieties ==
The usual constructive definition in the case of algebraic varieties proceeds in steps. The definition given below is for the intersection number of divisors on a nonsingular variety X.

1. The only intersection number that can be calculated directly from the definition is the intersection of hypersurfaces (subvarieties of X of codimension one) that are in general position at x. Specifically, assume we have a nonsingular variety X, and n hypersurfaces Z_{1}, ..., Z_{n} which have local equations f_{1}, ..., f_{n} near x for polynomials f_{i}(t_{1}, ..., t_{n}), such that the following hold:

- $n = \dim_k X$.
- $f_i(x) = 0$ for all i. (i.e., x is in the intersection of the hypersurfaces.)
- $\dim_x \cap_{i=1}^n Z_i = 0$ (i.e., the divisors are in general position.)
- The $f_i$ are nonsingular at x.

Then the intersection number at the point x (called the intersection multiplicity at x) is

$$(Z_1 \cdots Z_n)_x := \dim_k \mathcal{O}_{X, x} / (f_1, \dots, f_n)$$,

where $\mathcal{O}_{X, x}$ is the local ring of X at x, and the dimension is dimension as a k-vector space. It can be calculated as the localization $k[U]_{\mathfrak{m}_x}$, where $\mathfrak{m}_x$ is the maximal ideal of polynomials vanishing at x, and U is an open affine set containing x and containing none of the singularities of the f_{i}.

2. The intersection number of hypersurfaces in general position is then defined as the sum of the intersection numbers at each point of intersection.

$$(Z_1 \cdots Z_n) = \sum_{x \in \cap_i Z_i} (Z_1 \cdots Z_n)_x$$

3. Extend the definition to effective divisors by linearity, i.e.,

$(n Z_1 \cdots Z_n) = n(Z_1 \cdots Z_n)$ and $((Y_1 + Z_1) Z_2 \cdots Z_n) = (Y_1 Z_2 \cdots Z_n) + (Z_1 Z_2 \cdots Z_n)$.

4. Extend the definition to arbitrary divisors in general position by noticing every divisor has a unique expression as D = P – N for some effective divisors P and N. So let D_{i} = P_{i} – N_{i}, and use rules of the form

$$((P_1 - N_1) P_2 \cdots P_n) = (P_1 P_2 \cdots P_n) - (N_1 P_2 \cdots P_n)$$

to transform the intersection.

5. The intersection number of arbitrary divisors is then defined using a "Chow's moving lemma" that guarantees we can find linearly equivalent divisors that are in general position, which we can then intersect.

Note that the definition of the intersection number does not depend on the order in which the divisors appear in the computation of this number.

== Serre's Tor formula ==
Let V and W be two subvarieties of a nonsingular projective variety X such that dim(V) + dim(W) = dim(X). Then we expect the intersection V ∩ W to be a finite set of points. If we try to count them, two kinds of problems may arise. First, even if the expected dimension of V ∩ W is zero, the actual intersection may be of a large dimension: for example the self-intersection number of a projective line in a projective plane. The second potential problem is that even if the intersection is zero-dimensional, it may be non-transverse, for example, if V is a plane curve and W is one of its tangent lines.

The first problem requires the machinery of intersection theory, discussed above in detail, which replaces V and W by more convenient subvarieties using the moving lemma. On the other hand, the second problem can be solved directly, without moving V or W. In 1965 Jean-Pierre Serre described how to find the multiplicity of each intersection point by methods of commutative algebra and homological algebra. This connection between a geometric notion of intersection and a homological notion of a derived tensor product has been influential and led in particular to several homological conjectures in commutative algebra.

Serre's Tor formula states: let X be a regular variety, V and W two subvarieties of complementary dimension such that V ∩ W is zero-dimensional. For any point x ∈ V ∩ W, let A be the local ring $\mathcal{O}_{X, x}$ of x. The structure sheaves of V and W at x correspond to ideals I, J ⊆ A. Then the multiplicity of V ∩ W at the point x is

$$e(X; V, W; x) = \sum_{i=0}^{\infty} (-1)^i \mathrm{length}_A(\operatorname{Tor}_i^A(A/I, A/J))$$

where length is the length of a module over a local ring, and Tor is the Tor functor. When V and W can be moved into a transverse position, this homological formula produces the expected answer. So, for instance, if V and W meet transversely at x, the multiplicity is 1. If V is a tangent line at a point x to a parabola W in a plane at a point x, then the multiplicity at x is 2.

If both V and W are locally cut out by regular sequences, for example if they are nonsingular, then in the formula above all higher Tor's vanish, hence the multiplicity is positive. The positivity in the arbitrary case is one of Serre's multiplicity conjectures.

== Further definitions ==
The definition can be vastly generalized, for example to intersections along subvarieties instead of just at points, or to arbitrary complete varieties.

In algebraic topology, the intersection number appears as the Poincaré dual of the cup product. Specifically, if two manifolds, X and Y, intersect transversely in a manifold M, the homology class of the intersection is the Poincaré dual of the cup product $D_M X \smile D_M Y$ of the Poincaré duals of X and Y.

== Snapper–Kleiman definition of intersection number ==
There is an approach to intersection number, introduced by Snapper in 1959-60 and developed later by Cartier and Kleiman, that defines an intersection number as an Euler characteristic.

Let X be a scheme over a scheme S, Pic(X) the Picard group of X and G the Grothendieck group of the category of coherent sheaves on X whose support is proper over an Artinian subscheme of S.

For each L in Pic(X), define the endomorphism c_{1}(L) of G (called the first Chern class of L) by

$$c_1(L)F= F - L^{-1} \otimes F.$$

It is additive on G since tensoring with a line bundle is exact. One also has:

- $c_1(L_1)c_1(L_2) = c_1(L_1) + c_1(L_2) - c_1(L_1 \otimes L_2)$; in particular, $c_1(L_1)$ and $c_1(L_2)$ commute.
- $c_1(L)c_1(L^{-1}) = c_1(L) + c_1(L^{-1}).$
- $\dim \operatorname{supp} c_1(L)F \le \dim \operatorname{supp} F - 1$ (this is nontrivial and follows from a dévissage argument.)

The intersection number

$$L_1 \cdot {\dots} \cdot L_r$$

of line bundles L_{i}'s is then defined by:

$$L_1 \cdot {\dots} \cdot L_r \cdot F = \chi(c_1(L_1) \cdots c_1(L_r) F)$$

where χ denotes the Euler characteristic. Alternatively, one has by induction:

$$L_1 \cdot {\dots} \cdot L_r \cdot F = \sum_0^r (-1)^i \chi(\wedge^i (\oplus_0^r L_j^{-1}) \otimes F).$$

Each time F is fixed, $L_1 \cdot {\dots} \cdot L_r \cdot F$ is a symmetric functional in L_{i}'s.

If L_{i} = O_{X}(D_{i}) for some Cartier divisors D_{i}'s, then we will write $D_1 \cdot {\dots } \cdot D_r$ for the intersection number.

Let $f:X \to Y$ be a morphism of S-schemes, $L_i, 1 \le i \le m$ line bundles on X and F in G with $m \ge \dim \operatorname{supp}F$. Then

$f^*L_1 \cdots f^* L_m \cdot F = L_1 \cdots L_m \cdot f_* F$.

== Intersection multiplicities for plane curves ==
There is a unique function assigning to each triplet $(P,Q,p)$ consisting of a pair of projective curves, $P$ and $Q$, in $K[x,y]$ and a point $p \in K^2$, a number $I_p(P,Q)$ called the intersection multiplicity of $P$ and $Q$ at $p$ that satisfies the following properties:

1. $I_p(P,Q) = I_p(Q,P)$
2. $I_p(P,Q) = \infty$ if and only if $P$ and $Q$ have a common factor that is zero at $p$
3. $I_p(P,Q) = 0$ if and only if one of $P(p)$ or $Q(p)$ is non-zero (i.e. the point $p$ is not in the intersection of the two curves)
4. $I_p(x,y) = 1$ where $p = (0,0)$
5. $I_p(P,Q_1Q_2) = I_p(P,Q_1) + I_p(P,Q_2)$
6. $I_p(P + QR,Q) = I_p(P,Q)$ for any $R \in K[x,y]$

Although these properties completely characterize intersection multiplicity, in practice it is realised in several different ways.

One realization of intersection multiplicity is through the dimension of a certain quotient space of the power series ring $K[[x,y]]$. By making a change of variables if necessary, we may assume that $p = (0,0)$. Let $P(x,y)$ and $Q(x,y)$ be the polynomials defining the algebraic curves we are interested in. If the original equations are given in homogeneous form, these can be obtained by setting $z = 1$. Let $I = (P,Q)$ denote the ideal of $K[[x,y]]$ generated by $P$ and $Q$. The intersection multiplicity is the dimension of $K[[x,y]]/I$ as a vector space over $K$.

Another realization of intersection multiplicity comes from the resultant of the two polynomials $P$ and $Q$. In coordinates where $p = (0,0)$, the curves have no other intersections with $y = 0$, and the degree of $P$ with respect to $x$ is equal to the total degree of $P$, $I_p(P,Q)$ can be defined as the highest power of $y$ that divides the resultant of $P$ and $Q$ (with $P$ and $Q$ seen as polynomials over $K[x]$).

Intersection multiplicity can also be realised as the number of distinct intersections that exist if the curves are perturbed slightly. More specifically, if $P$ and $Q$ define curves which intersect only once in the closure of an open set $U$, then for a dense set of $(\epsilon,\delta) \in K^2$, $P - \epsilon$ and $Q - \delta$ are smooth and intersect transversally (i.e. have different tangent lines) at exactly some number $n$ points in $U$. We say then that $I_p(P,Q) = n$.

=== Example ===
Consider the intersection of the x-axis with the parabola $y = x^2$ at the origin.

Writing $P = y,$ $Q = y - x^2,\$and $p = (0,0)$ we get

$$I_p(P,Q) = I_p(y,y - x^2) = I_p(y,x^2) = I_p(y,x) + I_p(y,x) = 1 + 1 = 2.\,$$

Thus, the intersection multiplicity is two; it is an ordinary tangency. Similarly one can compute that the curves $y = x^m$ and $y = x^n$ with integers $m>n\geq 0$ intersect at the origin with multiplicity $n.$

== Self-intersections ==
Some of the most interesting intersection numbers to compute are self-intersection numbers. This means that a divisor is moved to another equivalent divisor in general position with respect to the first, and the two are intersected. In this way, self-intersection numbers can become well-defined, and even negative.

== Applications ==
The intersection number is partly motivated by the desire to define intersection to satisfy Bézout's theorem.

The intersection number arises in the study of fixed points, which can be cleverly defined as intersections of function graphs with a diagonals. Calculating the intersection numbers at the fixed points counts the fixed points with multiplicity, and leads to the Lefschetz fixed-point theorem in quantitative form.
