= Hofstadter's butterfly =

Fractal describing electrons in a magnetic field

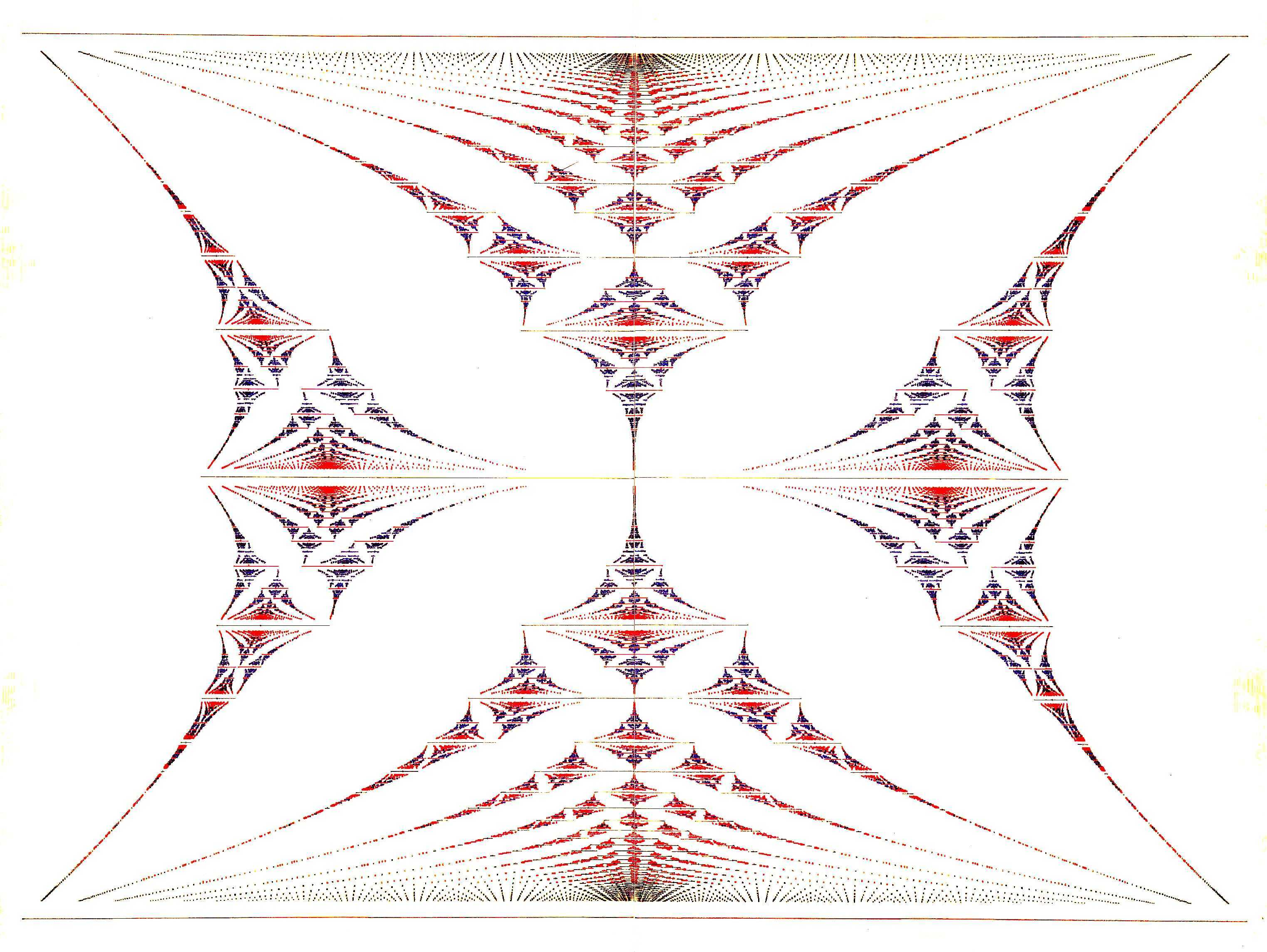
Rendering of the butterfly by Hofstadter

In condensed matter physics, Hofstadter's butterfly is a graph of the spectral properties of non-interacting two-dimensional electrons in a perpendicular magnetic field in a lattice. The fractal, self-similar nature of the spectrum was discovered in the 1976 Ph.D. work of Douglas Hofstadter and is one of the early examples of modern scientific data visualization. The name reflects the fact that, as Hofstadter wrote, "the large gaps [in the graph] form a very striking pattern somewhat resembling a butterfly."

The Hofstadter butterfly plays an important role in the theory of the integer quantum Hall effect and the theory of topological quantum numbers.

== History ==
The first mathematical description of electrons on a 2D lattice, acted on by a perpendicular homogeneous magnetic field, was studied by Rudolf Peierls and his student R. G. Harper in the 1950s.

Hofstadter first described the structure in 1976 in an article on the energy levels of Bloch electrons in perpendicular magnetic fields. It gives a graphical representation of the spectrum of Harper's equation at different frequencies. One key aspect of the mathematical structure of this spectrum – the splitting of energy bands for a specific value of the magnetic field, along a single dimension (energy) – had been previously mentioned in passing by Soviet physicist Mark Azbel in 1964 (in a paper cited by Hofstadter), but Hofstadter greatly expanded upon that work by plotting all values of the magnetic field against all energy values, creating the two-dimensional plot that first revealed the spectrum's uniquely recursive geometric properties.

Written while Hofstadter was at the University of Oregon, his paper was influential in directing further research. It predicted on theoretical grounds that the allowed energy level values of an electron in a two-dimensional square lattice, as a function of a magnetic field applied perpendicularly to the system, formed what is now known as a fractal set. That is, the distribution of energy levels for small-scale changes in the applied magnetic field recursively repeats patterns seen in the large-scale structure. "Gplot", as Hofstadter called the figure, was described as a recursive structure in his 1976 article in Physical Review B, written before Benoit Mandelbrot's newly coined word "fractal" was introduced in an English text. Hofstadter also discusses the figure in his 1979 book Gödel, Escher, Bach. The structure became generally known as "Hofstadter's butterfly".

David J. Thouless and his team discovered that the butterfly's wings are characterized by Chern integers, which provide a way to calculate the Hall conductance in Hofstadter's model.

In 2016, physicist Indubala Satija published an entire book describing and celebrating the Hofstadter butterfly, Butterfly in the Quantum World: The story of the most fascinating quantum fractal.

=== Confirmation ===
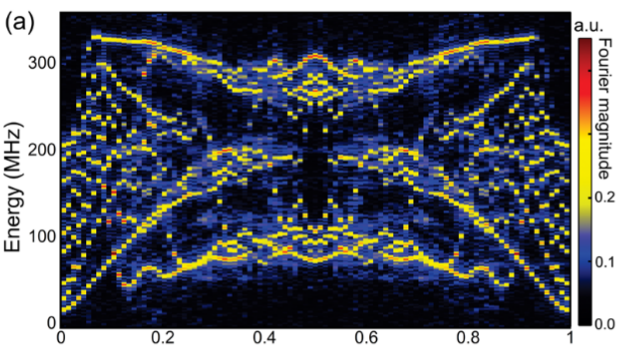
A simulation of electrons via superconducting qubits yields Hofstadter's butterfly

In 1997 the Hofstadter butterfly was reproduced in experiments with a microwave guide equipped with an array of scatterers. The similarity between the mathematical description of the microwave guide with scatterers and Bloch's waves in the magnetic field allowed the reproduction of the Hofstadter butterfly for periodic sequences of the scatterers.

In 2001, Christian Albrecht, Klaus von Klitzing, and coworkers realized an experimental setup to test Thouless et al.'s predictions about Hofstadter's butterfly with a two-dimensional electron gas in a superlattice potential.

In 2013, three separate groups of researchers independently reported evidence of the Hofstadter butterfly spectrum in graphene devices fabricated on hexagonal boron nitride substrates. In this instance the butterfly spectrum results from the interplay between the applied magnetic field and the large-scale moiré pattern that develops when the graphene lattice is oriented with near zero-angle mismatch to the boron nitride.

In September 2017, John Martinis's group at Google, in collaboration with the Angelakis group at CQT Singapore, published results from a simulation of 2D electrons in a perpendicular magnetic field using interacting photons in 9 superconducting qubits. The simulation recovered Hofstadter's butterfly, as expected.

In 2021 the butterfly was observed in twisted bilayer graphene at the second magic angle.

== Theoretical model ==
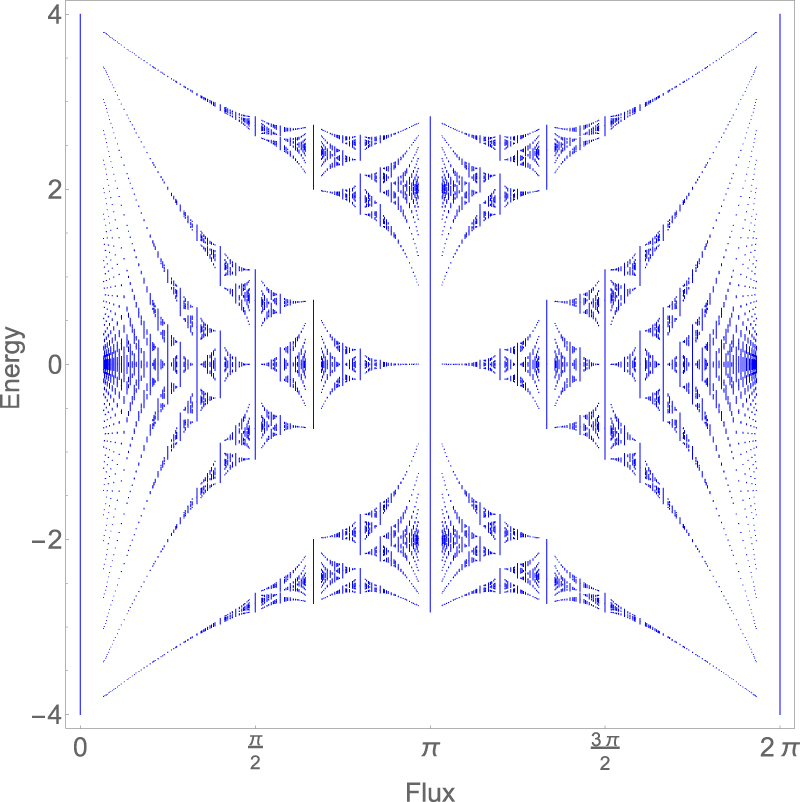
Hofstadter butterfly is the graphical solution to Harper's equation, where the energy ratio $\epsilon$ is plotted as a function of the flux ratio $2\pi\alpha$.

In his original paper, Hofstadter considers the following derivation: a charged quantum particle in a two-dimensional square lattice, with a lattice spacing $a$, is described by a periodic Schrödinger equation, under a perpendicular static homogeneous magnetic field restricted to a single Bloch band. For a 2D square lattice, the tight binding energy dispersion relation is

$$W(\mathbf{k})=E_0(\cos k_x a+\cos k_y a)=\frac{E_0}{2}(e^{ik_xa}+e^{-ik_xa}+e^{ik_ya}+e^{-ik_ya})$$,

where $W(\mathbf{k})$ is the energy function, $\mathbf{k}=(k_x,k_y)$ is the crystal momentum, and $E_0$ is an empirical parameter. The magnetic field $\mathbf{B}=\nabla\times\mathbf{A}$, where $\mathbf{A}$ the magnetic vector potential, can be taken into account by using Peierls substitution, replacing the crystal momentum with the canonical momentum $\hbar\mathbf{k}\to\mathbf{p}-q\mathbf{A}$, where $\mathbf{p}=(p_x,p_y)$ is the particle momentum operator and $q$ is the charge of the particle ($q=-e$ for the electron, $e$ is the elementary charge). For convenience we choose the gauge $\mathbf{A}=(0,Bx,0)$.

Using the property that $e^{ip_ja}$ is a translation operator, so that $e^{ip_xa}\psi(x,y)=\psi(x+a,y)$, where $j=x,y,z$ and $\psi(\mathbf{r})=\psi(x,y)$ is the particle's two-dimensional wave function. One can use $W(\mathbf{p}-q\mathbf{A})$ as an effective Hamiltonian to obtain the following time-independent Schrödinger equation:

$$E\psi(x,y)=\frac{E_0}{2}\left[\psi(x+a,y)+\psi(x-a,y)+\psi(x,y+a)e^{-iqBxa/\hbar}+\psi(x,y-a)e^{+iqBxa/\hbar}\right].$$

Considering that the particle can only hop between points in the lattice, we write $x=na,y=m a$, where $n,m$ are integers. Hofstadter makes the following ansatz: $\psi(x,y)=g_ne^{i\nu m}$, where $\nu$ depends on the energy, in order to obtain Harper's equation (also known as almost Mathieu operator for $\lambda = 1$):

$$g_{n+1} +g_{n-1}+2\cos(2\pi n \alpha -\nu)g_n=\epsilon g_n,$$

where $\epsilon=2E/E_0$ and $\alpha=\phi(B)/\phi_0$, $\phi(B)=Ba^2$ is proportional to the magnetic flux through a lattice cell and $\phi_0=2\pi\hbar/q$ is the magnetic flux quantum. The flux ratio $\alpha$ can also be expressed in terms of the magnetic length $l_{\rm m}=\sqrt{\hbar/eB}$, such that $\alpha=(2\pi)^{-1}(a/l_{\rm m})^2$.

Hofstadter's butterfly is the resulting plot of $\epsilon_\alpha$ as a function of the flux ratio $\alpha$, where $\epsilon_\alpha$ is the set of all possible $\epsilon$ that are a solution to Harper's equation.

=== Solutions to Harper's equation and Wannier treatment ===
Hofstadter's butterfly phase diagram at zero temperature. The horizontal axis indicates electron density, starting with no electrons from the left. The vertical axis indicates the strength of the magnetic flux, starting from zero at the bottom, the pattern repeats periodically for higher fields. The colors represent the Chern numbers of the gaps in the spectrum, also known as the TKNN (Thouless, Kohmoto, Nightingale and Nijs) integers. Blueish cold colors indicate negative Chern numbers, warm red colors indicate positive Chern numbers, white indicates zero.

Due to the cosine function's properties, the pattern is periodic on $\alpha$ with period 1 (it repeats for each quantum flux per unit cell). The graph in the region of $\alpha$ between 0 and 1 has reflection symmetry in the lines $\alpha=\frac{1}{2}$ and $\epsilon=0$. Note that $\epsilon$ is necessarily bounded between -4 and 4.

Harper's equation has the particular property that the solutions depend on the rationality of $\alpha$. By imposing periodicity over $n$, one can show that if $\alpha=P/Q$ (a rational number), where $P$ and $Q$ are distinct prime numbers, there are exactly $Q$ energy bands. For large $Q\gg P$, the energy bands converge to thin energy bands corresponding to the Landau levels.

Gregory Wannier showed that by taking into account the density of states, one can obtain a Diophantine equation that describes the system, as

$$\frac{n}{n_0}=S+T\alpha$$

where

$$n=\int^{\epsilon_{\rm F}}_{-4}\rho(\epsilon)\mathrm{d}\epsilon\;;\;n_0=\int^{4}_{-4}\rho(\epsilon)\mathrm{d}\epsilon$$

where $S$ and $T$ are integers, and $\rho(\epsilon)$ is the density of states at a given $\alpha$. Here $n$ counts the number of states up to the Fermi energy, and $n_0$ corresponds to the levels of the completely filled band (from $\epsilon=-4$ to $\epsilon=4$). This equation characterizes all the solutions of Harper's equation. Most importantly, one can derive that when $\alpha$ is an irrational number, there are infinitely many solution for $\epsilon_\alpha$.

The union of all $\epsilon_\alpha$ forms a self-similar fractal that is discontinuous between rational and irrational values of $\alpha$. This discontinuity is nonphysical, and continuity is recovered for a finite uncertainty in $B$ or for lattices of finite size. The scale at which the butterfly can be resolved in a real experiment depends on the system's specific conditions.

=== Phase diagram, conductance and topology ===
The phase diagram of electrons in a two-dimensional square lattice, as a function of a perpendicular magnetic field, chemical potential and temperature, has infinitely many phases. Thouless and coworkers showed that each phase is characterized by an integral Hall conductance, where all integer values are allowed. These integers are known as Chern numbers.

== See also ==
- Aubry–André model
- Schrodinger's Cat
