= Mark Azbel =

Soviet and Israeli physicist (1932–2020)

- Марк Яковлевич Азбель
- Born: Mark Yakovlevich Azbel; 12 May 1932; Kharkiv, Ukrainian Soviet Socialist Republic, Soviet Union
- Died: 31 March 2020 (aged 87); Israel
- Education: National University of Kharkiv
- Scientific career
- Fields: Solid-state physics
- Workplaces: Tel Aviv University Moscow State University National University of Kharkiv
- Doctoral advisor: Lev Landau and Pyotr Kapitsa

Mark Yakovlevich Azbel (Russian: Марк Яковлевич Азбель; 12 May 1932 — 31 March 2020) was a Soviet and Israeli physicist. He was a member of the American Physical Society.

Between 1956 and 1958, he experimentally demonstrated cyclotron resonance in metals, and worked out its theoretical basis.

Azbel's 1964 analysis of Bloch electrons in a magnetic field contained ideas which were prescient of both the renormalization group and (though he did not make this explicit) the possibility of a fractal that was eventually discovered by Douglas Hofstadter and later called Hofstadter's butterfly.

== Biography ==
Azbel was born in 1932, in Kharkiv (at the time, in the Ukrainian Soviet Socialist Republic) to a family of physicians. From 1941, aged 9 to 12, he and his family lived under wartime evacuation in (Siberia).

In 1944, the family returned to Kharkiv. In 1948 Azbel graduated from high school and in the same year entered the National University of Kharkiv. After graduation, he taught mathematics at evening school.

In 1958, he defended his doctorate (Doctor of Physical and Mathematical Sciences) under the supervision of Lev Landau and Pyotr Kapitsa. In 1964 he began working at Moscow State University and concurrently as a section chair at the Landau Institute for Theoretical Physics.

In 1972, Azbel applied for emigration from the Soviet Union to Israel, and in 1973 (a full four years before leaving the Soviet Union) was appointed a lecturer at Tel Aviv University, where he initially gave his lectures by telephone.

Having been refused exit permission from the Soviet Union, he participated in the movement of refuseniks in the USSR in the mid-seventies. Azbel finally emigrated from the USSR in 1977 and was appointed Professor at Tel Aviv University. He lived mainly in Israel until his death in 2020.

== Scientific contributions ==
Azbel was a theoretical physicist. His areas of study included the quantum physics of electrons in metals, and he made the first prediction of cyclotron resonance in metals, now widely known as the Azbel-Kaner resonance.

In an important 1964 article, Azbel made conjectures about the nature of the Harper spectrum which contributed to the discovery of the Hofstadter butterfly in 1974.

== Works ==
- Mark Azbel (1981). Refusenik, trapped in the Soviet Union. Forbes, Grace Pierce. Boston: Houghton Mifflin. ISBN 0-395-30226-9. OCLC 6735540.
- Electron Theory of Metals. Ilia M. Lifshits, Mark Ya. Azbel, Moisei I. Kaganov. Consultants Bureau. 1973. ISBN 9780306108730. OCLC 797018485.
- Azbel, M. Ya. (1964). "Energy Spectrum of a Conduction Electron in a Magnetic Field". Journal of Experimental and Theoretical Physics. 19 (3): 634–645.

== Awards and prizes ==
- Lomonosov Prize, 1966
- Lomonosov Prize, 1968
- Landau Prize, Israel, 1989
- Humboldt Prize, Germany, 2001
