= Samuel Clowes Huneke =

American historian

Samuel Clowes Huneke is an American historian of modern Europe, author, and essayist. He is associate professor of history at George Mason University.

Huneke graduated from Amherst College with a bachelor's degree summa cum laude in German and Mathematics in 2011. In 2012, he earned an MSc with Distinction in Applicable Mathematics from the London School of Economics. In 2019, he earned his PhD in modern European history from Stanford University, where he studied with historian Edith Sheffer.

His first book, States of Liberation: Gay Men between Dictatorship and Democracy in Cold War Germany (2022) won the Charles E. Smith Award for best book in European History from the European History Section of the Southern Historical Association. He is also the author of A Queer Theory of the State (2023).

In addition to his scholarly publications, his essays have appeared in The Atlantic, The New Republic, Boston Review, and Los Angeles Review of Books.

His parents are Slavicist Edith Clowes and mathematician Craig Huneke.

== Works ==
=== Books ===
- States of Liberation: Gay Men between Dictatorship and Democracy in Cold War Germany. University of Toronto Press. 2022. ISBN 978-1-4875-4213-9.
- A Queer Theory of the State. Floating Opera Press. 2023. ISBN 9783982389462.
- Chin, Rachel; Huneke, Samuel Clowes (2025). Reimagining Citizenship in Postwar Europe. Cornell University Press. ISBN 9781501779206.
