= Almost Mathieu operator =

Self-adjoint operator that arises in physical transition problems

In mathematical physics, the almost Mathieu operator, named for its similarity to the Mathieu operator introduced by Émile Léonard Mathieu, arises in the study of the quantum Hall effect. It is given by

$$[H^{\lambda,\alpha}_\omega u](n) = u(n+1) + u(n-1) + 2 \lambda \cos(2\pi (\omega + n\alpha)) u(n), \,$$

acting as a self-adjoint operator on the Hilbert space $\ell^2(\mathbb{Z})$. Here $\alpha,\omega \in\mathbb{T}, \lambda > 0$ are parameters. In pure mathematics, its importance comes from the fact of being one of the best-understood examples of an ergodic Schrödinger operator. For example, three problems (now all solved) of Barry Simon's fifteen problems about Schrödinger operators "for the twenty-first century" featured the almost Mathieu operator. In physics, the almost Mathieu operators can be used to study metal to insulator transitions like in the Aubry–André model.

For $\lambda = 1$, the almost Mathieu operator is sometimes called Harper's equation.

== Ten martini problem ==
The structure of this operator's spectrum was first conjectured by Mark Kac, who offered ten martinis for the first proof of the following conjecture:

For all $\lambda \neq 0$, all irrational $a$, and all integers $n_1, n_2$, with $0 < n_1+ n_2a < 1$, there is a gap for the almost Mathieu operator on which $k(E) = n_1 + n_2a$, where $k(E)$ is the integrated density of states.

This problem was named the 'Dry Ten Martini Problem' by Barry Simon as it was 'stronger' than the weaker problem which became known as the 'Ten Martini Problem':

For all $\lambda \neq 0$, all irrational $a$, and all $\omega$, the spectrum of the almost Mathieu operator is a Cantor set.

== Spectral type ==
If $\alpha$ is a rational number, then $H^{\lambda,\alpha}_\omega$ is a periodic operator and by Floquet theory its spectrum is purely absolutely continuous.

Now to the case when $\alpha$ is irrational. Since the transformation $\omega \mapsto \omega + \alpha$ is minimal, it follows that the spectrum of $H^{\lambda,\alpha}_\omega$ does not depend on $\omega$. On the other hand, by ergodicity, the supports of absolutely continuous, singular continuous, and pure point parts of the spectrum are almost surely independent of $\omega$. It is now known that

- For $0 < \lambda < 1$, $H^{\lambda,\alpha}_\omega$ has surely purely absolutely continuous spectrum. (This was one of Simon's problems.)
- For $\lambda= 1$, $H^{\lambda,\alpha}_\omega$ has surely purely singular continuous spectrum for any irrational $\alpha$.
- For $\lambda > 1$, $H^{\lambda,\alpha}_\omega$ has almost surely pure point spectrum and exhibits Anderson localization. (It is known that almost surely can not be replaced by surely.)

That the spectral measures are singular when $\lambda \geq 1$ follows (through the work of Yoram Last and Simon) from the lower bound on the Lyapunov exponent $\gamma(E)$ given by

$$\gamma(E) \geq \max \{0,\log(\lambda)\}. \,$$

This lower bound was proved independently by Joseph Avron, Simon and Michael Herman, after an earlier almost rigorous argument of Serge Aubry and Gilles André. In fact, when $E$ belongs to the spectrum, the inequality becomes an equality (the Aubry–André formula), proved by Jean Bourgain and Svetlana Jitomirskaya.

== Structure of the spectrum ==
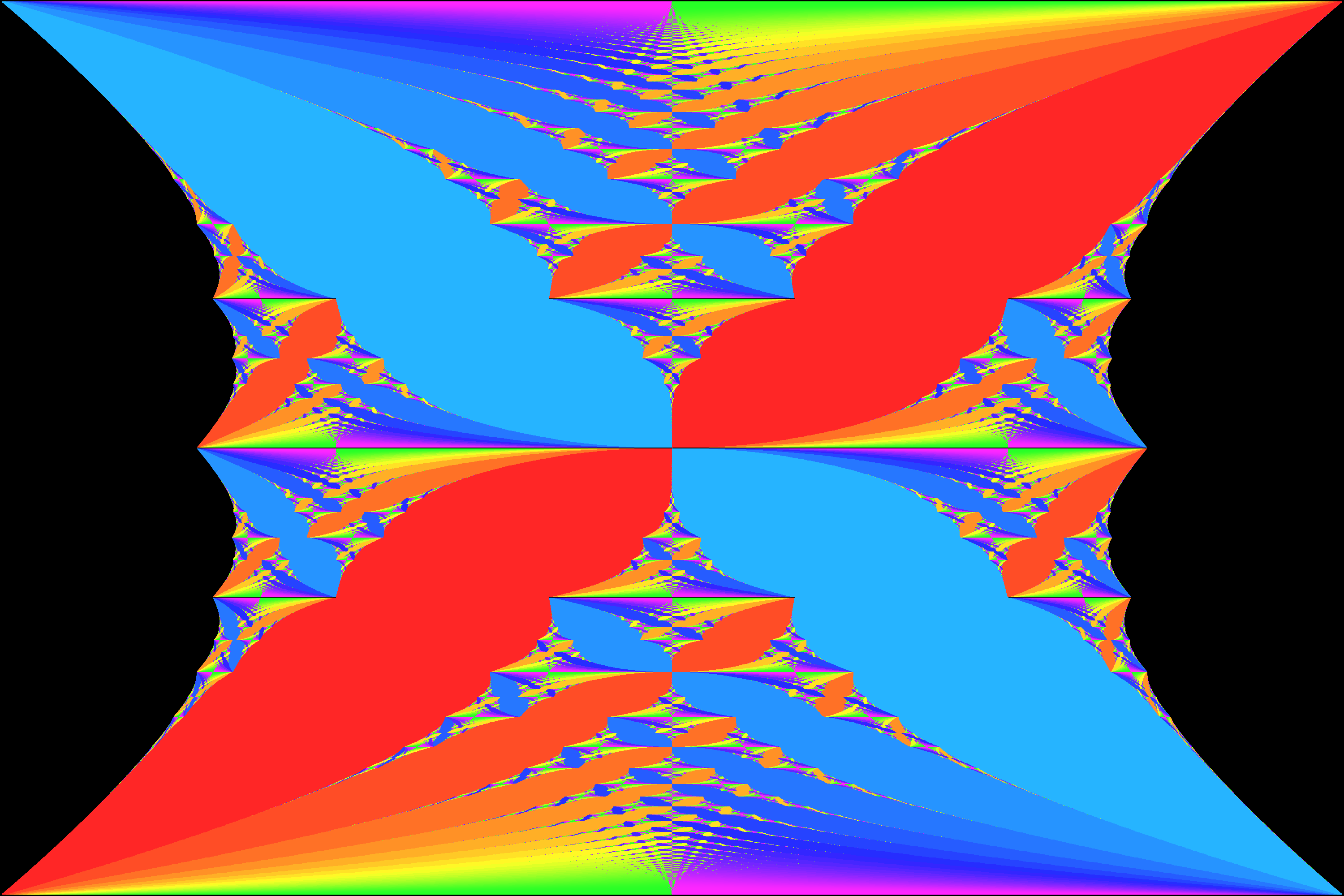
Hofstadter's butterfly

Another striking characteristic of the almost Mathieu operator is that its spectrum is a Cantor set for all irrational $\alpha$ and $\lambda > 0$. This was shown by Avila and Jitomirskaya solving the by-then famous 'Ten Martini Problem' (also one of Simon's problems) after several earlier results (including generically and almost surely with respect to the parameters).

Furthermore, the Lebesgue measure of the spectrum of the almost Mathieu operator is known to be

$$\operatorname{Leb}(\sigma(H^{\lambda,\alpha}_\omega)) = |4 - 4 \lambda| \,$$

for all $\lambda > 0$. For $\lambda = 1$ this means that the spectrum has zero measure (this was first proposed by Douglas Hofstadter and later became one of Simon's problems). For $\lambda \neq 1$, the formula was discovered numerically by Aubry and André and proved by Jitomirskaya and Krasovsky. Earlier Last had proven this formula for most values of the parameters.

The study of the spectrum for $\lambda =1$ leads to the Hofstadter's butterfly, where the spectrum is shown as a set.
