= An Invitation to Algebraic Geometry =

Graduate level introductory textbook on algebraic geometry

- Author: Karen E. Smith; Lauri Kahanpää; Pekka Kekäläinen; William Traves
- Language: English
- Series: Universitext
- Subject: Algebraic Geometry
- Genre: Textbook
- Publisher: Springer Verlag
- Publication date: 2000
- Pages: 155

An Invitation to Algebraic Geometry is a graduate level introductory textbook on Algebraic Geometry. It provides a broad survey of fundamental ideas rather than a detailed or technical course of study. It is based on lectures by Karen Smith given in Finland in 1996, and published by Springer Verlag in 2000.

== Topics ==
The book has eight chapters and an appendix. The chapter headings give a good summary of the topics covered: Affine Algebraic Varieties, Algebraic Foundations, Projective Varieties, Quasi-Projective Varieties, Classical Constructions, Smoothness, Birational Geometry, and Maps to Projective Spaces.

== Audience and reception ==
The book is based on lectures given to Ph.D students and mature mathematicians with backgrounds primarily in classical and topological analysis. So few algebraic prerequisites are presumed.

Quoting from reviews gives a good sense of the style of the book. Mark Green says "It is a genuinely entry-level book that begins with the definition of a prime ideal and the Nullstellensatz." Thomas Garrity says "This is a wonderfully intuitive book, stressing the general ideas. It would be a good place to start for any student with a firm first course in algebra that included ring theory." Peter Rabinovitch says the book "is a tasty introduction — if after looking through it you are not interested in algebraic geometry, I don’t think you ever will be." Green goes on to say that "There is a consistent policy throughout the book of tying in elementary algebraic geometry to recent developments by current leaders such as Kollar, Kontsevich, Mori, Lazarsfeld, and de Jong, so that readers come away with a clear conception of where this is all going and what the next steps might be if a particular topic sparks their interest."
