= Ana Caraiani =

Romania mathematician

- Born: 1984 (age 41–42); Bucharest, Romania
- Education: Harvard University; Princeton University
- Awards: Alice T. Schafer Prize (2007); Whitehead Prize (2018); American Mathematical Society Fellow (2020); EMS Prize (2020); New Horizons in Mathematics Prize (2023); Satter Prize (2025)
- Scientific career
- Fields: Mathematics
- Workplaces: Imperial College London; University of Bonn; Institute for Advanced Study; Princeton University; University of Chicago
- Thesis: Local-global compatibility and the action of monodromy on nearby cycles (2012)
- Doctoral advisor: Richard Taylor
- Other academic advisors: Andrew Wiles

Ana Caraiani (born 1984) is a Romanian mathematician, who is a Royal Society University Research Fellow and Professor at Imperial College London. Her research interests include algebraic number theory and the Langlands program.

== Education ==
She was born in Bucharest and studied at Mihai Viteazul High School. In 2001, Caraiani became the first Romanian female competitor in 25 years at the International Mathematical Olympiad, where she won a silver medal. In the following two years, she won two gold medals.

After graduating high school in 2003, she pursued her studies in the United States. As an undergraduate student at Princeton University, Caraiani was a two-time Putnam Fellow (the only female competitor at the William Lowell Putnam Mathematical Competition to win more than once) and Elizabeth Lowell Putnam Award winner. Caraiani graduated summa cum laude from Princeton in 2007, with an undergraduate thesis on Galois representations supervised by Andrew Wiles.

Caraiani did her graduate studies at Harvard University under the supervision of Wiles' student Richard Taylor, earning her Ph.D. in 2012 with a dissertation concerning local-global compatibility in the Langlands correspondence.

== Career ==
After spending a year as an L.E. Dickson Instructor at the University of Chicago, she returned to Princeton and the Institute for Advanced Study as a Veblen Instructor and NSF Postdoctoral Fellow. In 2016, she moved to the Hausdorff Center for Mathematics as a Bonn Junior Fellow. She moved to Imperial College London in 2017 as a Royal Society University Research Fellow and Senior Lecturer. In 2019, she became a Royal Society University Research Fellow and Reader at Imperial College London. As of 2021, Caraiani is a full professor at Imperial College London. She was also Hausdorff Chair at University of Bonn in 2022–2023.

== Recognition ==
In 2007, the Association for Women in Mathematics awarded Caraiani their Alice T. Schafer Prize. In 2018, she was one of the winners of the Whitehead Prize of the London Mathematical Society.

She was elected as a Fellow of the American Mathematical Society in the 2020 Class, for "contributions to arithmetic geometry and number theory, in particular the $p$-adic Langlands program". She is one of the 2020 winners of the EMS Prize. In September 2022 she was awarded the 2023 New Horizons in Mathematics Prize. She was elected to the Academia Europaea in 2024. In 2025 she was awarded the Ruth Lyttle Satter Prize in Mathematics.
