= Serre's multiplicity conjectures =

Partially resolved conjectures in mathematics

In mathematics, Serre's multiplicity conjectures, named after Jean-Pierre Serre, are certain problems in commutative algebra, motivated by the needs of algebraic geometry. Since André Weil's initial definition of intersection numbers, around 1949, there had been a question of how to provide a more flexible and computable theory, which Serre sought to address. In 1958, Serre realized the classical algebraic-geometric ideas of multiplicity could be generalized using the concepts of homological algebra.

Let R be a Noetherian, commutative, regular local ring and let P and Q be the prime ideals of R. Serre defined the intersection multiplicity of R/P and R/Q by means of their Tor functors. Below, $\ell_R(M)$ denotes the length of the module $M$, and for the remainder of the article, we assume

$$\ell _R((R/P)\otimes_R (R/Q)) < \infty.$$

Serre defined the intersection multiplicity of R/P and R/Q by the Euler characteristic-like formula:

$$\chi (R/P,R/Q):=\sum _{i=0}^\infty (-1)^i\ell_R (\operatorname{Tor}^R_i(R/P,R/Q)).$$

In order for this definition to provide a good generalization of the classical intersection multiplicity, one would want certain classical relationships to continue to hold. Serre singled out four important properties, which became the multiplicity conjectures, and are challenging to prove in the general case. The statements of these conjectures can be generalized so that R/P and R/Q are replaced by arbitrary finitely generated modules: see Serre 2000 for more details.

== Dimension inequality ==
$$\dim(R/P) + \dim(R/Q) \le \dim(R)$$

Serre proved this for all regular local rings using the Cohen structure theorem. He established the following three properties when R is either of equal characteristic or of mixed characteristic and unramified (which in this case means that characteristic of the residue field is not an element of the square of the maximal ideal of the local ring), and conjectured that they hold in general.

== Non-negativity ==
$$\chi (R/P,R/Q) \ge 0$$

This property was proven by Ofer Gabber in 1995 using A. J. de Jong's methods. Dutta demonstrated this property becomes complex when studied in the case of blow ups, especially for mixed characteristics.

== Vanishing ==
If

$$\dim (R/P) + \dim (R/Q) < \dim (R)\$$

then

$$\chi (R/P,R/Q) = 0.\$$

This property was proven in 1985 by Paul C. Roberts using local Chern characters. It was independently proven by Henri Gillet and Christophe Soulé in 1987, by using K-theory. A new proof for this property using regular schemes was published by SP Dutta in 2008.

== Positivity ==
If

$$\dim (R/P) + \dim (R/Q) = \dim (R)\$$

then

$$\chi (R/P,R/Q) > 0.\$$

The proof for this property in the general case remains open.

The property was proved for a special case in 2008 by SP Dutta; the case being when the projective scheme of a graded ring finitely generated over its 0th component is artinian local, when one of F and G has a finite resolution by direct sum of copies of O(t) for various t. Another special case was proven by C. Skalit in 2019, for regular local rings that are essentially smooth over a two-dimensional, regular base.

== See also ==
- Homological conjectures in commutative algebra
