= Leonard Eisenbud =

American physicist (1913–2004)

- Born: August 3, 1913; Elizabeth, New Jersey
- Died: November 30, 2004 (aged 91); Haverford, Pennsylvania
- Education: Union College (B.S.); Princeton University (Ph.D.)
- Children: David Eisenbud
- Scientific career
- Doctoral advisor: Eugene Wigner

Leonard Eisenbud (August 3, 1913– November 30, 2004) was an American theoretical physicist.

Eisenbud earned his bachelor's degree at Union College in Schenectady, New York in 1935. He spent the year 1940/1941 at the Institute for Advanced Study. During World War II he worked on radar at the Radiation Laboratory at MIT. After the war, he earned his doctorate at Princeton University in 1948 under Eugene Wigner.

During the McCarthy Era, he had trouble obtaining an academic position. From 1948–1958 he worked at the Bartol Research Institute.

In 1958 he became a professor at the State University of New York at Stony Brook, where he helped to establish the physics department. He served as chairman of the department from 1958–1962 and 1968–1969, becoming emeritus in 1983.

Eisenbud was a friend of Paul Erdős. He wrote a book about nuclear physics with Eugene Wigner. He also wrote a book about the conceptual foundations of quantum mechanics.

He is the father of the mathematician David Eisenbud. The Eisenbud Lectures at Brandeis University are named for him and endowed by him. He was a fellow of the American Physical Society.

== Eisenbud Prize ==
The Leonard Eisenbud Prize for Mathematics and Physics at the American Mathematical Society is named for him.
