= Aubry–André model =

Toy model for electronic localization

The Aubry–André model is a toy model of a one-dimensional crystal with onsite energies which are modulated by an irrational parameter. The essential novelty offered by this model is that in spite of being one-dimensional, it gives rise to single particle states which are either delocalized or localized, depending on the relative strength of the potential. For this reason the model is employed to study both quasicrystals and the Anderson localization transition. It was first developed by Serge Aubry and Gilles André in 1980.

== Hamiltonian of the model ==
Aubry-André metal-insulator transition, inverse of localization length $l_{\rm loc}$ as a function of energy ratios $\lambda/J$.

The Aubry–André model describes a one-dimensional lattice with hopping between nearest-neighbor sites and periodically varying onsite energies. It is a tight-binding (single-band) model with no interactions. The full Hamiltonian can be written as

$$H=\sum_{n}\Bigl(-J |n\rangle\langle n+1| -J|n+1\rangle\langle n| + \epsilon_n |n\rangle\langle n|\Bigr)$$,

where the sum goes over all lattice sites $n$, $|n\rangle$ is a Wannier state on site $n$, $J$ is the hopping energy, and the on-site energies $\epsilon_n$ are given by

$$\epsilon_n=\lambda\cos(2\pi \beta n +\varphi)$$.

Here $\lambda$ is the amplitude of the variation of the onsite energies, $\varphi$ is a relative phase, and $\beta$ is the modulation of the onsite potential modulation in units of the lattice constant. The important aspect of the model is that $\beta$ is an irrational number (often taken to be the golden ratio). As such, the model has infinite periodicity, and is distinct from standard lattice models which have finite periodicity. The Hamiltonian is self-dual as it retains the same form after a Fourier transformation interchanging the roles of position and momentum.

== Localization transition ==
For irrational values of $\beta$, corresponding to a modulation of the onsite energy incommensurate with the underlying lattice, the single particle states of the model go from being delocalized to localized as $\lambda$ is varied. For example, for $\beta=(1+\sqrt{5})/2$ (the golden ratio) and almost any $\varphi$, if $\lambda>2J$ the eigenmodes are exponentially localized, while if $\lambda<2J$ the eigenmodes are extended. The Aubry-André localization transition happens at the critical value of $\lambda$ which separates these two behaviors, $\lambda=2J$.

While this quantum phase transition between a delocalized state and a localized state resembles the disorder-driven Anderson localization transition, there are some key differences between the two phenomena. In particular the Aubry–André model has no actual disorder, only incommensurate modulation of onsite energies. This is why the Aubry-André transition happens at a finite value of the pseudo-disorder strength $\lambda$, whereas in one dimension the Anderson transition happens at zero disorder strength.

== Energy spectrum ==
The energy spectrum $E_n$ is a function of $\beta$ and is given by the almost Mathieu equation

$$E_n\psi_n=-J(\psi_{n+1}+\psi_{n-1})+\epsilon_n \psi_n$$.

At $\lambda=2J$ this is equivalent to the famous fractal energy spectrum known as the Hofstadter's butterfly, which describes the motion of an electron in a two-dimensional lattice under a magnetic field. In the Aubry–André model the magnetic field strength maps onto the parameter $\beta$.

For general $\lambda$ and for any irrational value of $\beta$ the spectrum of the almost Mathieu equation is known to be a Cantor set. This results from the solution of the ten martini problem. For comparison, the energy spectra of periodic lattice models exhibits energy bands, while that of lattice models with uncorrelated disorder (such as the Anderson model) is an everywhere dense set of points.

== The many-body system: metal-insulator phase diagram ==
The single particle states localize when $\lambda=2J$. This suggests the existence of a metal-insulator transition, since extended states can conduct, while localized states can not. However, metals, and insulators, are by definition many-electron systems, and Walter Kohn has argued in a seminal work that conduction vs. insulation does not necessarily depend on what happens at the single particle level. Instead, it depends on the collective behavior of all potentially mobile charge carriers. Indeed, in the Aubry–André model, when the single-particle states are filled (i.e. there are more than one particles in the system), the phase diagram takes an unusual form as a function of particle density. In the thermodynamic limit particle densities which are rational numbers undergo a metal-insulator transition at $\lambda=2J$ (where single particle states localize), but particle densities corresponding to certain irrational fillings are always localized ($\lambda=0$). For example, if $\beta$ is the golden ratio, then the fillings at which the system is always insulating are the irrational numbers to which ratios of Fibonacci numbers or sums thereof tend. In this sense the metal-insulator phase diagram of the Aubry–André model is similar to an indicator function.

== Realization ==
In 2008, G. Roati et al. experimentally realized the Aubry-André localization phase transition using a gas of ultracold atoms in an incommensurate optical lattice.

In 2009, Y. Lahini et al. realized the Aubry–André model in photonic lattices.

== See also ==
- Arnold tongue
- Bose–Hubbard model
