= Valentina Borok =

Soviet and Ukrainian mathematician

- Born: Valentina Mikhailovna Borok; 9 July 1931; Kharkiv, Soviet Union
- Died: 4 February 2004 (aged 72); Haifa, Israel
- Occupations: Mathematician, professor
- Years active: 1949–1994
- Spouse(s): Yakov Zhitomirskii
- Children: Svetlana Jitomirskaya

Valentina Mikhailovna Borok (Russian: Валентина Михайловна Борок; Ukrainian: Валентина Михайлівна Борок, romanized: Valentyna Mykhailivna Borok; 9 July 1931 – 4 February 2004) was a Soviet and Ukrainian mathematician. She is mainly known for her work on partial differential equations.

== Life ==
Borok was born into a Jewish family on July 9, 1931, in Kharkiv, Soviet Union (now Ukraine). Her father, Mikhail Borok, was a chemist, scientist and an expert in material science. Her mother, Bella Sigal, was a well-known economist. Because of her mothers' high position at the ministry of Economics, Valentina Borok had a privileged early childhood. However, because of the political situation, her mother voluntarily resigned in 1937, and took a lower position, presumably because she knew she couldn't possibly have been spared the repressions of the late 1930s. This possibly helped the Borok family survive World War II.

Valentina Borok had a talent for math even in her high school years. So in 1949, with the advice of her high school teachers Borok started to study Mathematics at Kyiv State University. There she met Yakov Zhitomirskii, who would be her husband until her death. In Kyiv, Borok, along with her future husband, started her research in the field of mathematics under the supervision of the mathematics department supervisor, Georgii Shilov. Her undergraduate thesis on distribution theory and the applications to the theory of systems of linear partial differential equations was found to be extraordinary and was published in a top Russian journal. This thesis was later selected in 1957 to be part of the first volumes of American Mathematical Society translations. In 1954, Borok graduated from Kyiv State University and moved to Moscow State University in order to receive her graduate degree. In 1957, she received her Candidate of Sciences degree for her thesis On Systems of Linear Partial Differential Equations with Constant Coefficients. The information about the system of Linear Partial Differential equations with constant coefficient was publicized in the annals of mathematics. She later published more papers from 1954 to 1959, which contained a range of inverse theorems that allowed partial differential equations to be characterized by certain properties of their solutions. “In the same period she obtained formula that made it possible to compute in simple algebraic terms the numerical parameters that determine classes of uniqueness and well-posed of the Cauchy problem for systems of linear partial differential equations with constant coefficients". In 1960, she moved to Kharkiv State University, where she stayed until 1994. In 1970, Borok became a full professor and from 1983 to 1994, she was the Chair of the analysis department.

In the early 1960s Borok worked on the stability for partial differential equations well-posed. Her other works at this time were on the parabolic systems degenerating at infinity and on the dependence of classes of uniqueness on the transformations of the spatial argument. most of her works during this period of time were mostly joint works with her husband Yakov Zhitomirskii.

And during the period of the late 1960s, Borok began her series of papers that laid the foundations for the theory of local and non-local boundary value problems in infinite layers for systems of partial differential equations. The results of her studies included the construction of maximal classes of uniqueness and well-posedness, Phragmen- Lindelöf type theorems, and the study of asymptotic properties and stability of solutions of boundary-value problems in infinite layers.

Starting in the early 1970s, Borok opened a school for the study of the general theory of Partial Differential Equations in Kharkiv State University. Many of her papers helped the development of the theory of local and non-local boundary value problems in infinite layers for systems of Partial differential equations. One of her earliest works includes results on the uniqueness and well-posedness of the solutions of the Cauchy problem. Most of her works were concentrated in the area of Partial differential equations along with functional-differential equations. even to this day many of her works are being cited.

During her years as a professor at Kharkiv State University, Borok was considered the teacher of rigorous analysis, which was a course in which many of the students got their first taste in research. Borok was known for her "creative problems" as well as her development of original lecture notes for many of the core and specialized courses in analysis and Partial differential Equations. She established the curriculum of the mathematics department in Kharkiv State University for more than 30 years, thus setting the tradition in the university.

In 1994, Borok became severely ill but because there was no necessary medical attention available in Ukraine, she had to move to Haifa, Israel, where she died at the age of 72 in 2004. Both of her children, Mikhail Zhitomirskii and Svetlana Jitomirskaya, became research mathematicians.

== Works ==
Borok is known for her research and contribution on the partial differentiation equation. During her lifetime she published 80 papers in top Soviet, Russian and Ukrainian journals as well as supervised 16 PhDs along with many master theses.

Many of her thesis development included the studies of the Cauchy problem for the linear partial differential equations, which was published in the Annals of Mathematics explaining the theory behind the linear partial differential equation. In other works she has proved the theorem on uniqueness and well-posedness theorems for the initial value problem as well as the Cauchy problem for system of linear partial differential equations.

In her studies, translated from Russian, in the Cauchy problem for systems of linear partial differential equations that are functional with respect to parameter, Her summary states that she proves that for the study in Cauchy problem for≠ system of equations of the form đu(x,y,z)/đt = P(đ/đx)u(x,t,ɖy), xɛRn, tɛ[0,T],y>0,ɖ>0, ɖ≠1, uɛCn, Where P(S) is an N x N Matrix with polynomial elements. We prove the existence of solutions of the homogeneous problem which exponentially converge to zero as |x|→∞ and for each y>0. she established estimates for the solutions as |x|→∞, y→∞ or y→+0 which guarantee its uniqueness. and she found conditions for the correct solvability of the problem in the class of solutions which are polynomial with respect to y.
