= Juha Heinonen =

Finnish mathematician

Juha Heinonen (23 July 1960, Toivakka – 30 October 2007) was a Finnish mathematician, known for his research on geometric function theory.

== Biography ==
Heinonen, whose father was a lumberjack and local politician, grew up in a small town in central Finland. He studied mathematics at the University of Jyväskylä and received his doctorate there in 1987 with a thesis on nonlinear potential theory. His thesis advisor was Olli Martio. During the academic year 1987–1988 Heinonen was a visiting researcher at the Deutsche Forschunsgemeinschaft in Bonn and then at the Centre de Recerca Matemática in Barcelona. He first came to the University of Michigan as a visiting graduate student in 1985, and then came back as a three-year postdoctoral assistant professor from 1988 to 1991. In 1992 he was hired there as a tenure-track assistant professor, and spent the rest of his career there until his death from kidney cancer in 2007. He was promoted to full professor in 2000. He was the author or coauthor of three books (one of which was published posthumously) and over 60 research articles.

He was a leading contributor to the development of nonsmooth calculus in geometric analysis on metric spaces. His 2007 article Nonsmooth calculus is an important survey of the subject.

The objects of interest in nonsmooth calculus as described by Heinonen are spaces of homogeneous type, or metric measured spaces where a generalization of Poincaré inequality is true. In such spaces the differential calculus goes a long way: Sobolev spaces, differentiation theorems, Hardy spaces. It is noticeable that in such a general situation we don't have enough structure to define differentials, but only various constructions corresponding to the norm of a differential of a function.

In 1992 Heinonen was a Sloan Research Fellow. In 2002 he was an Invited Speaker with talk The branch set of a quasireglar mapping at the International Congress of Mathematicians in Beijing. In 2004 he was elected a member of the Finnish Academy of Science and Letters.

A gifted athlete, Juha is still revered as a local sports celebrity. Many Finns remember his achievements in cross-county skiing, including Finland's 1976 gold medal in the 5 km race in his class. More recently, he traveled around Finland and North America to compete in orienteering, placing in nearly every major US competition he entered. He is widely remembered in US orienteering circles for winning both the US and the North American gold medal in his class in the year 2000 ...

In 1991 he married the mathematician Karen E. Smith. They had three children.

== Selected publications ==
=== Articles ===
- Heinonen, Juha; Kilpeläinen, Tero (1988). "On the Wiener criterion and quasilinear obstacle problems". Transactions of the American Mathematical Society. 310: 239. doi:10.1090/S0002-9947-1988-0965751-8.
- ——; Koskela, Pekka (1994). "$A$_{∞}-condition for the Jacobian of a quasiconformal mapping". Proceedings of the American Mathematical Society. 120 (2): 535. doi:10.1090/S0002-9939-1994-1169029-X.
- —— (1995). "The diameter conjecture for quasiconformal maps is true in space". Proceedings of the American Mathematical Society. 123 (6): 1709. doi:10.1090/S0002-9939-1995-1234626-0.
- ——; Koskela, Pekka (1998). "Quasiconformal maps in metric spaces with controlled geometry". Acta Mathematica. 181: 1–61. doi:10.1007/BF02392747. S2CID 59366197.
- Hanson, Bruce; —— (2000). "An $n$-dimensional space that admits a Poincaré inequality but has no manifold points". Proceedings of the American Mathematical Society. 128 (11): 3379–3390. doi:10.1090/S0002-9939-00-05453-8.
- —— (2006). "What is a quasiconformal mapping?" (PDF). Notices of the AMS. 53 (11): 1134–1135.
- —— (2007). "Nonsmooth calculus". Bulletin of the American Mathematical Society. 44 (2): 163–233. doi:10.1090/S0273-0979-07-01140-8. ISSN 0273-0979.

=== Books and monographs ===
- Heinonen, Juha; Kilpeläinen, Tero; Martio, Olli (19 September 2012). Nonlinear Potential Theory of Degenerate Elliptic Equations. Mineola, New York: Dover Publications. ISBN 9780486149257. (originally published by Oxford University Press in 1993)
- Heinonen, Juha (2001). Lectures on Analysis on Metric Spaces. Springer. doi:10.1007/978-1-4613-0131-8. ISBN 9780387951041.
- —— (2005). Lectures on Lipschitz analysis (PDF). Vol. 100. University of Jyväskylä.
- ——; Koskela, Pekka; Shanmugalingam, Nageswari; Tyson, Jeremy T. (5 February 2015). Sobolev Spaces on Metric Measure Spaces. Cambridge University Press. ISBN 978-1-107-09234-1.
