= Svetlana Jitomirskaya =

American mathematician

- Світлана Житомирська
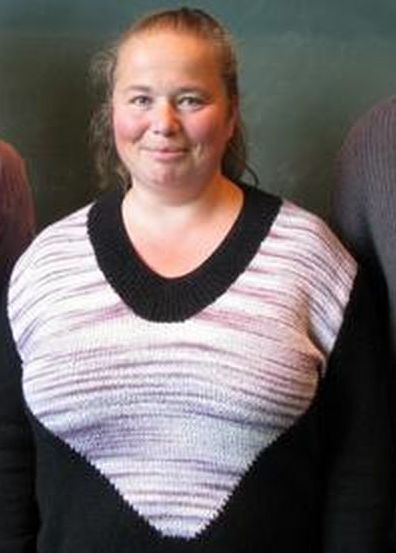
- Born: June 4, 1966 (age 60); Kharkiv, Ukrainian SSR, Soviet Union (now Ukraine)
- Education: Moscow State University
- Known for: Ten martini problem
- Parent: Valentina Borok
- Awards: Ruth Lyttle Satter Prize in Mathematics (2005); Dannie Heineman Prize for Mathematical Physics (2020); Olga Ladyzhenskaya Prize (2022)
- Scientific career
- Fields: Mathematics
- Workplaces: UC Irvine; Georgia Tech
- Thesis: Spectral and Statistical Properties of Lattice Hamiltonians (1991)
- Doctoral advisor: Yakov Sinai

Svetlana Yakovlevna Jitomirskaya (Note: Ukrainian: Світлана Яківна Житомирська, romanized: Svitlana Yakivna Zhytomyrska) (born June 4, 1966) is a mathematician working on dynamical systems and mathematical physics. She serves as the Richard and Rhonda Goldman Distinguished Chair and Professor of Mathematics at the University of California, Berkeley. She is best known for pioneering nonperturbative methods in quasiperiodic operators, and for solving the ten martini problem along with mathematician Artur Avila.

== Education and career ==
Jitomirskaya was born to a Jewish family in Kharkiv, in the Soviet Union, and grew up in her home city. Both her mother, Valentina Borok, and her father, Yakov Zhitomirskii, were professors of mathematics.

Her undergraduate studies were at Moscow State University, where she was a student of, among others, Vladimir Arnold and Yakov Sinai. She obtained her Ph.D. from Moscow State University in 1991 under the supervision of Yakov Sinai. After joining the University of California, Irvine mathematics department in 1991 as a part-time lecturer, she remained on the faculty there until 2023, rising to full professor in 2000. She also served as the inaugural Elaine M. Hubbard Chair Professor at the Georgia Institute of Technology from 2022 to 2023, before joining the University of California, Berkeley in the Fall 2023 as a distinguished chair and professor.

== Honors ==
In 2005, she was awarded the Ruth Lyttle Satter Prize in Mathematics, "for her pioneering work on non-perturbative quasiperiodic localization".

She was an invited speaker at the 2002 International Congress of Mathematicians, in Beijing. She was a plenary speaker at the 2022 International Congress of Mathematicians, originally scheduled for Saint Petersburg. After the Russian invasion of Ukraine in February 2022, congress organizers changed plans, and moved some events online, and others to Helsinki, Finland. Jitomirskaya's July 14 plenary address, Small denominators and multiplicative Jensen's formula, is available online.

She received a Sloan Fellowship in 1996.

In 2018 she was named to the American Academy of Arts and Sciences.

Jitomirskaya is the 2020 winner of the Dannie Heineman Prize for Mathematical Physics, becoming the second woman to win the prize and the first woman to be the sole winner of the prize. The award citation credited her "for work on the spectral theory of almost-periodic Schrödinger operators and related questions in dynamical systems. In particular, for her role in the solution of the Ten Martini problem, concerning the Cantor set nature of the spectrum of all almost Mathieu operators and in the development of the fundamental mathematical aspects of the localization and metal-insulator transition phenomena."

In 2022, she was elected to the National Academy of Sciences. On July 2, 2022, she received the inaugural Ladyzhenskaya Prize in Mathematical Physics (OAL Prize) “for her seminal and deep contributions to the spectral theory of almost periodic Schrödinger operators”

She was awarded the prestigious Barry Prize for Distinguished Intellectual Achievement by the American Academy of Sciences and Letters in 2023.

From 2009 to 2014, Jitomirskaya served on the Executive Committee of the International Association of Mathematical Physics (IAMP), including a term as Vice-President from 2012 to 2014. She was elected as an American Mathematical Society (AMS) Council member-at-large, serving from February 1, 2023, to January 31, 2026. Additionally, she serves as a board member of the Association for Mathematical Research (AMR).

== Personal life ==
Jitomirskaya is married to Vladimir Mandelshtam, a professor of chemistry at UC Irvine. Their daughter, Olya Mandelshtam, is a professor in the combinatorics and optimization department at the University of Waterloo.

== Selected publications ==
- Jitomirskaya, Svetlana Ya. (1999), "Metal-insulator transition for the almost Mathieu operator", Annals of Mathematics, Second Series, 150 (3): 1159–1175, arXiv:math/9911265, Bibcode:1999math.....11265J, doi:10.2307/121066, JSTOR 121066, MR 1740982, S2CID 10641385.
- Avila, Artur; Jitomirskaya, Svetlana (2009), "The Ten Martini Problem", Annals of Mathematics, Second Series, 170 (1): 303–342, arXiv:math/0503363, doi:10.4007/annals.2009.170.303, MR 2521117.
- Jitomirskaya, Svetlana; Last, Yoram (1999), "Power-law subordinacy and singular spectra. I. Half-line operators", Acta Mathematica, 183 (2): 171–189, doi:10.1007/BF02392827, MR 1738043.
