= Irena Peeva =

American mathematician

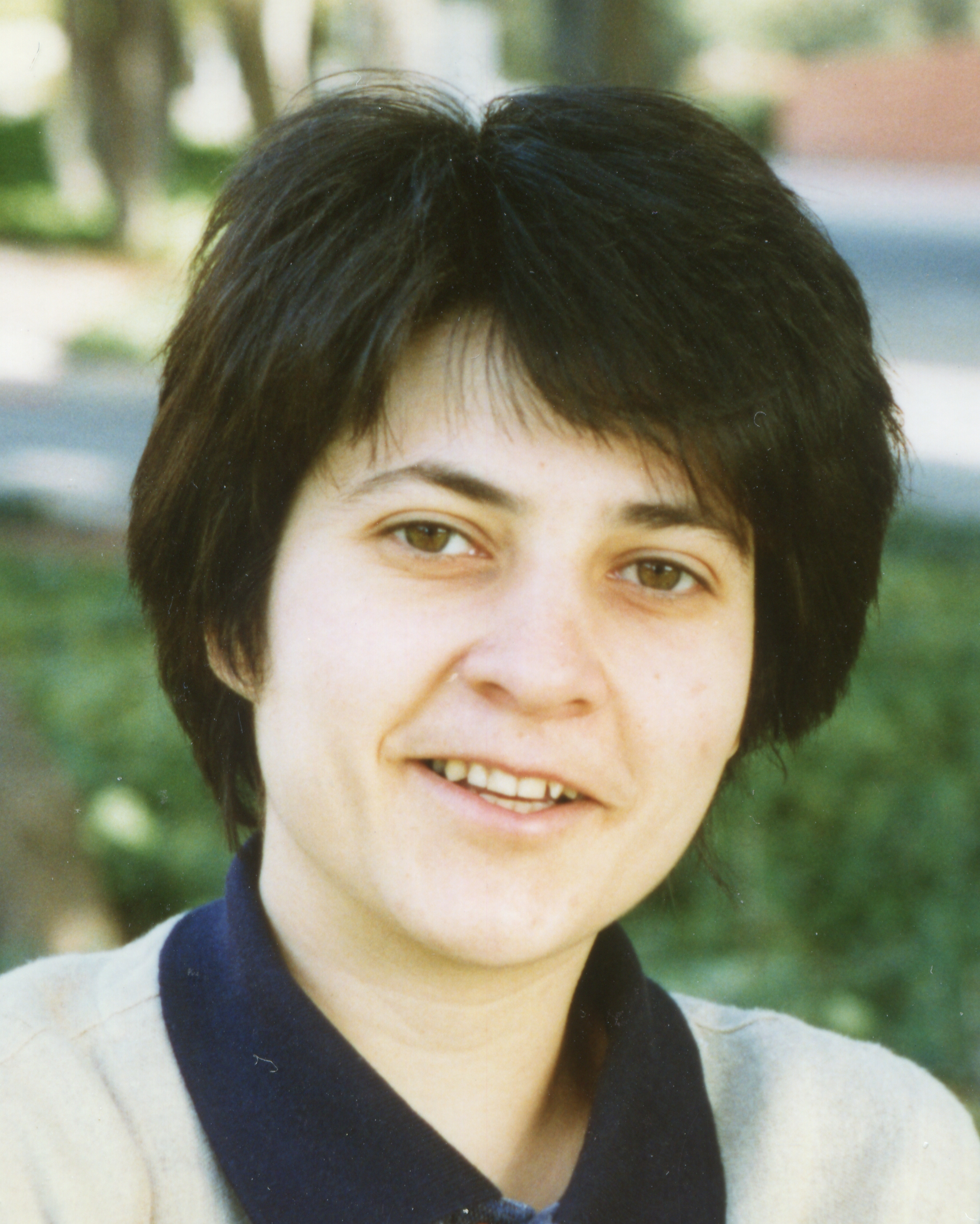
Peeva in 1995

Irena Vassileva Peeva is a professor of mathematics at Cornell University, specializing in commutative algebra. She disproved the Eisenbud–Goto regularity conjecture jointly with Jason McCullough.

== Education and career ==
Peeva did her graduate studies at Brandeis University, earning a Ph.D. in 1995 under the supervision of David Eisenbud with a thesis entitled Free Resolutions. She was a postdoctoral researcher at the University of California, Berkeley and a C. L. E. Moore instructor at the Massachusetts Institute of Technology before joining the Cornell Department of Mathematics faculty in 1998.

Peeva is an editor of the Transactions of AMS.

== Books ==
Peeva is the author of:

- Graded Syzygies (Springer, 2011).
- Minimal Free Resolutions over Complete Intersections (with David Eisenbud, Springer, 2016).

== Recognition ==
In 2014 Peeva was elected as a fellow of the American Mathematical Society "for contributions to commutative algebra and its applications."

In 2019/2020 and in 2012/2013 Peeva was a Simons Foundation fellow. During 1999-2001 she was a Sloan Foundation fellow and was a Sloan doctoral dissertation fellow in 1994/1995.
