= Melvin Hochster =

American mathematician (born 1943)

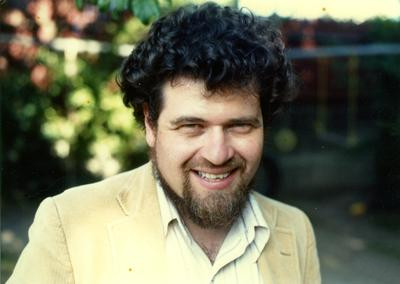
- Born: August 2, 1943 (age 83); New York City, New York, United States
- Education: Princeton University (Ph.D.); Harvard University (B.A.)
- Awards: Guggenheim Fellowship (1981); Cole Prize (1980); Putnam Fellow (1960)
- Scientific career
- Fields: Mathematics
- Workplaces: University of Michigan
- Thesis: Prime Ideal Structure in Commutative Rings (1967)
- Doctoral advisor: Goro Shimura
- Doctoral students: Karen E. Smith; Emily E. Witt

Melvin Hochster (born August 2, 1943) is an American mathematician working in commutative algebra. He is currently the Jack E. McLaughlin Distinguished University Professor Emeritus of Mathematics at the University of Michigan.

== Education ==
Hochster attended Stuyvesant High School, where he was captain of the Math Team, and received a B.A. from Harvard University. While at Harvard, he was a Putnam Fellow in 1960. He earned his Ph.D. in 1967 from Princeton University, where he wrote a dissertation under Goro Shimura characterizing the prime spectra of commutative rings.

== Career ==
He held positions at the University of Minnesota and Purdue University before joining the faculty at Michigan in 1977.

Hochster's work is primarily in commutative algebra, especially the study of modules over local rings. He has established classic theorems concerning Cohen–Macaulay rings, invariant theory and homological algebra. For example, the Hochster–Roberts theorem states that the invariant ring of a linearly reductive group acting on a regular ring is Cohen–Macaulay. His best-known work is on the homological conjectures, many of which he established for local rings containing a field, thanks to his proof of the existence of big Cohen–Macaulay modules and his technique of reduction to prime characteristic. His most recent work on tight closure, introduced in 1986 with Craig Huneke, has found unexpected applications throughout commutative algebra and algebraic geometry.

He has had more than 40 doctoral students, and the Association for Women in Mathematics has pointed out his outstanding role in mentoring women students pursuing a career in mathematics. He served as the chair of the department of Mathematics at the University of Michigan from 2008 to 2017.

== Awards ==
Hochster shared the 1980 Cole Prize with Michael Aschbacher, received a Guggenheim Fellowship in 1981, and has been a member of both the National Academy of Sciences and the American Academy of Arts and Sciences since 1992. In 2008, on the occasion of his 65th birthday, he was honored with a conference in Ann Arbor and with a special volume of the Michigan Mathematical Journal.

He was elected to the 2026 class of Fellows of the American Mathematical Society.

== See also ==
- Monomial conjecture
