= David Eisenbud =

American mathematician (born 1947)

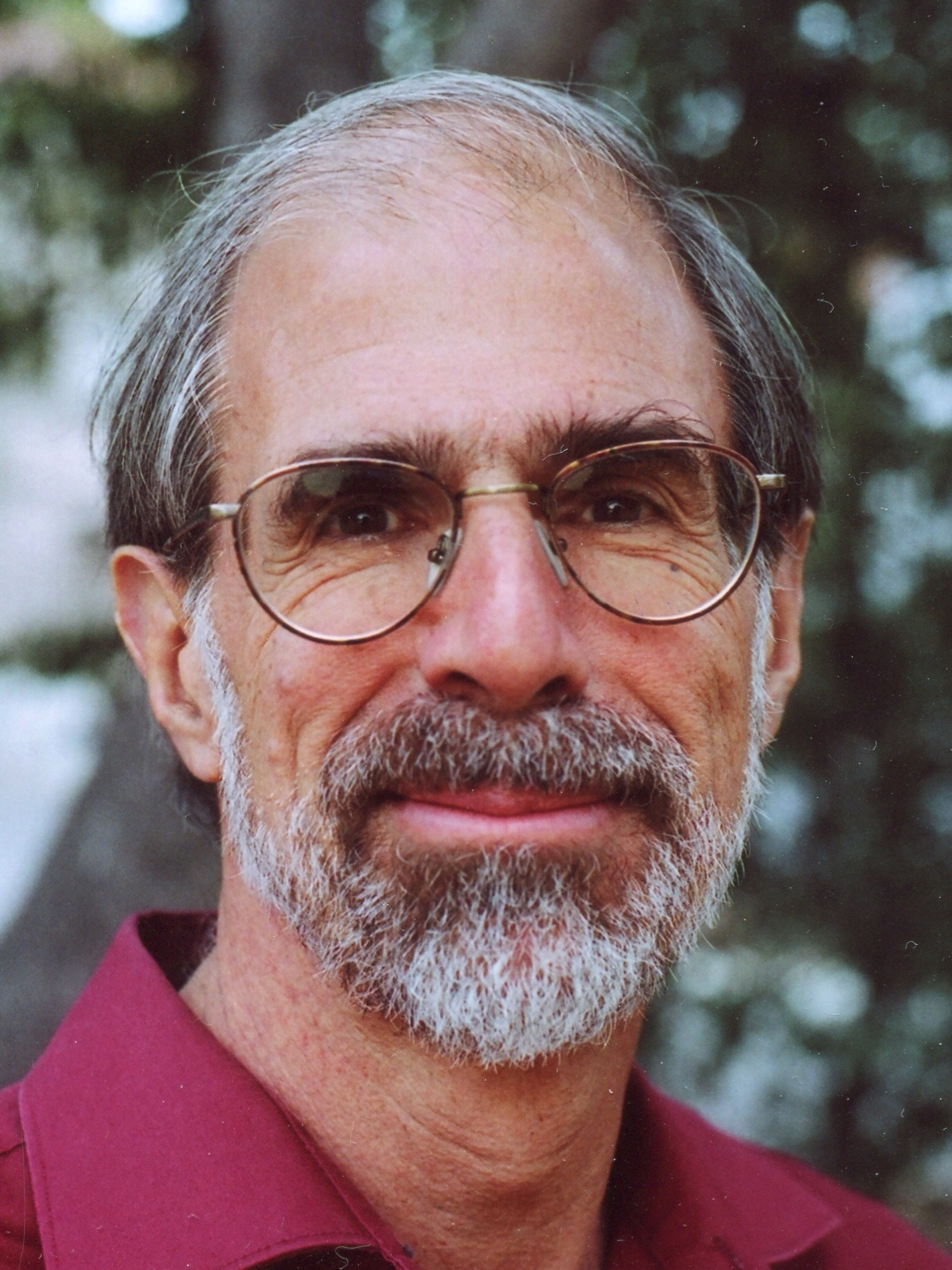
- Eisenbud in 2008
- Born: 8 April 1947 (age 79); New York City, New York
- Education: University of Chicago
- Awards: Leroy P. Steele Prize (2010)
- Scientific career
- Workplaces: University of California, Berkeley, and Mathematical Sciences Research Institute
- Thesis: Torsion Modules over Dedekind Prime Rings (1970)
- Doctoral advisor: Saunders Mac Lane
- Doctoral students: Craig Huneke; Mircea Mustaţă; Irena Peeva; Frank-Olaf Schreyer

David Eisenbud (born 8 April 1947) is an American mathematician. He is a professor of mathematics at the University of California, Berkeley and former director of Simons Laufer Mathematical Sciences Institute (SLMath) when it was known as the Mathematical Sciences Research Institute (MSRI). He served as director of MSRI from 1997 to 2007, and then again from 2013 to 2022.

== Early life, family and education ==
Eisenbud is the son of mathematical physicist Leonard Eisenbud, who was a student and collaborator of the renowned physicist Eugene Wigner.

David Eisenbud received his Ph.D. in 1970 from the University of Chicago, where he was a student of Saunders Mac Lane and, unofficially, James Christopher Robson.

== Career ==
Eisenbud taught at Brandeis University from 1970 to 1997, during which time he had visiting positions at Harvard University, Institut des Hautes Études Scientifiques (IHÉS), University of Bonn, and Centre national de la recherche scientifique (CNRS). He joined the staff at MSRI in 1997, and took a position at Berkeley at the same time.

From 2003 to 2005 Eisenbud was president of the American Mathematical Society.

Eisenbud's mathematical interests include commutative and non-commutative algebra, algebraic geometry, topology, and computational methods in these fields. He has written over 150 papers and books with over 60 co-authors. Notable contributions include the theory of matrix factorizations for maximal Cohen–Macaulay modules over hypersurface rings, the Eisenbud–Goto conjecture on degrees of generators of syzygy modules, and the Buchsbaum–Eisenbud criterion for exactness of a complex. He also proposed the Eisenbud–Evans conjecture, which was later settled by the Indian mathematician Neithalath Mohan Kumar.

Eisenbud has had 31 doctoral students, including Craig Huneke, Mircea Mustaţă, Irena Peeva, and Gregory G. Smith (winner of the Aisenstadt Prize in 2007).

He has appeared in Brady Haran's online video channel "Numberphile".

== Honors and awards ==
Eisenbud was elected Fellow of the American Academy of Arts and Sciences in 2006. He was awarded the Leroy P. Steele Prize in 2010. In 2012 he became a fellow of the American Mathematical Society.

== Personal life ==
Among Eisenbud's hobbies are music and juggling. He has written two papers on the mathematics of juggling.

== Selected publications ==
=== Books ===
- Eisenbud, David; Neumann, Walter (1985). Three-dimensional link theory and invariants of plane curve singularities. Annals of Mathematics Studies. Vol. 110. Princeton, N.J.: Princeton U. Press. vii+171. ISBN 978-0-691-08381-0.
- Eisenbud, David (1995). Commutative algebra with a view toward algebraic geometry. Graduate Texts in Mathematics. Vol. 150. New York: Springer-Verlag. xvi+785. ISBN 0-387-94268-8. MR 1322960.
- Eisenbud, David; Harris, Joe (2000). The geometry of schemes. Graduate Texts in Mathematics. Vol. 197. Berlin; New York: Springer-Verlag. x+294. ISBN 978-0-387-98638-8. MR 1730819.
- Eisenbud, David (2005). The geometry of syzygies. A second course in commutative algebra and algebraic geometry. Graduate Texts in Mathematics. Vol. 229. New York: Springer-Verlag. xvi+243. ISBN 0-387-22215-4.
- Eisenbud, David; Harris, Joe (2016). 3264 and All That: A Second Course in Algebraic Geometry. Cambridge University Press. ISBN 978-1107602724.

=== Articles ===
- Eisenbud, David; Harris, Joe (1989). "Progress in the theory of complex algebraic curves". Bull. Amer. Math. Soc. New Series. 21 (2): 205–232. doi:10.1090/s0273-0979-1989-15807-2. MR 1011763.
- Eisenbud, David; Green, Mark; Harris, Joe (1996). "Cayley-Bacharach theorems and conjectures". Bull. Amer. Math. Soc. New Series. 33 (3): 295–324. doi:10.1090/s0273-0979-96-00666-0. MR 1376653.

== See also ==
- Eisenbud–Levine–Khimshiashvili signature formula
