= Anderson localization =

Absence of diffusion waves in disordered media

In condensed matter physics, Anderson localization (also known as strong localization) is the absence of diffusion of waves in a disordered medium. In other words, disordered media are good at trapping waves. This phenomenon is named after the American physicist P. W. Anderson, who was the first to suggest that electron localization is possible in a lattice potential, provided that the degree of randomness (disorder) in the lattice is sufficiently large, as can be realized for example in a semiconductor with impurities or defects.

Anderson localization is a general wave phenomenon that applies to the transport of electromagnetic waves, acoustic waves, quantum waves, spin waves, etc. This phenomenon is to be distinguished from weak localization, which is the precursor effect of Anderson localization (see below), and from Mott localization, named after Sir Nevill Mott, where the transition from metallic to insulating behaviour is not due to disorder, but to a strong mutual Coulomb repulsion of electrons.

== Introduction ==
In the original Anderson tight-binding model, the evolution of the wave function ψ on the d-dimensional lattice Z^{d} is given by the Schrödinger equation
$$i \hbar \frac{d\psi}{dt} = H \psi,$$
where the Hamiltonian H is given by
$$H \psi_j = E_j \psi_j + \sum_{k \neq j} V_{jk} \psi_k,$$
where $j, k$ are lattice locations. The self-energy $E_j$ is taken as random and independently distributed. The interaction potential $V(r) = V\big(|j - k|\big)$ is required to fall off faster than $1/r^3$ in the $r \to \infty$ limit. For example, one may take $E_j$ uniformly distributed within a band of energies $[-W, +W],$ and
$$V\big(|r|\big) = \begin{cases}
1 & \text{if}\ |r| = |j - k| = 1, \\
0 & \text{otherwise.}
\end{cases}$$

Starting with $\psi_0$ localized at the origin, one is interested in how fast the probability distribution $|\psi|^2$ diffuses. Anderson's analysis shows the following:

- If $d$ is 1 or 2, and $W$ is arbitrary, or if $d \ge 3$ and $W/\hbar$ is sufficiently large, then the probability distribution remains localized:
  $$\sum_{n \in \mathbb{Z}^d} |\psi(t, n)|^2 |n| \leq C$$
  uniformly in $t$. This phenomenon is called Anderson localization.
- If $d \ge 3$, and $W/\hbar$ is small, then
  $$\sum_{n \in \mathbb{Z}^d} |\psi(t, n)|^2 |n| \approx D \sqrt{t},$$
  where D is the diffusion constant.

== Analysis ==
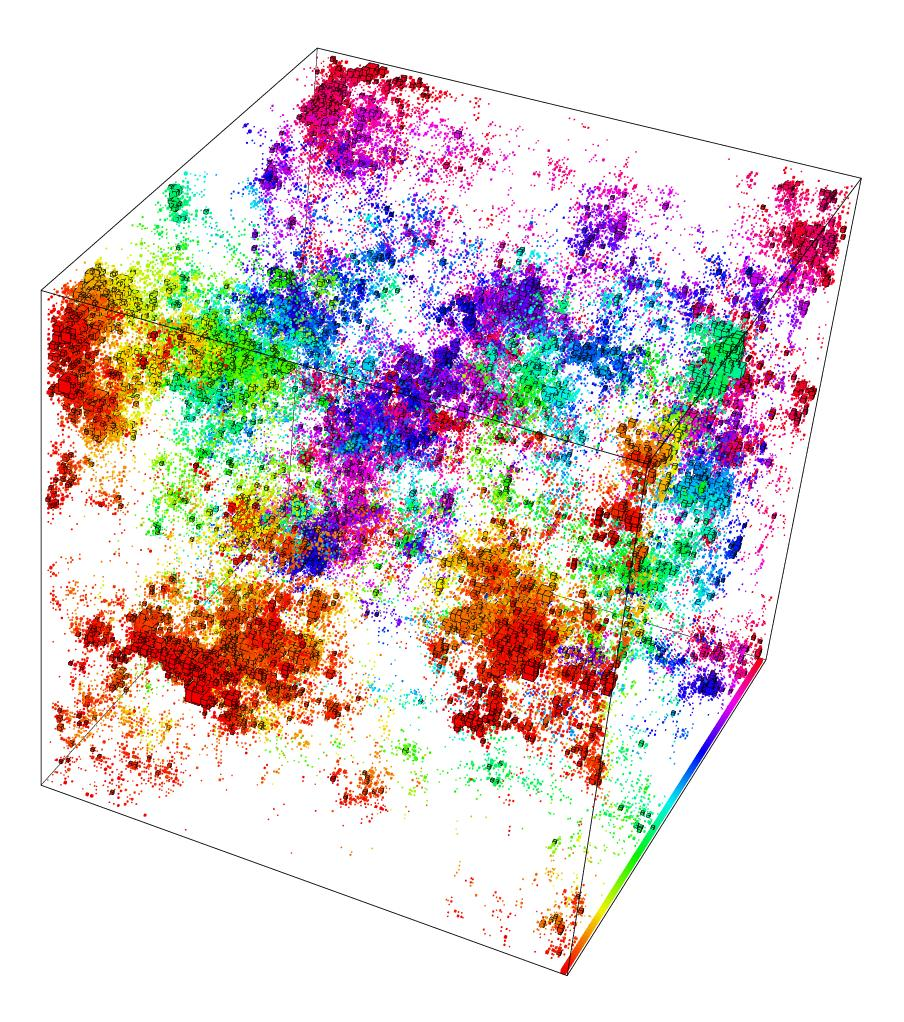
Example of a multifractal electronic eigenstate at the Anderson localization transition in a system with 1367631 atoms.

The phenomenon of Anderson localization, particularly that of weak localization, finds its origin in the wave interference between multiple-scattering paths. In the strong scattering limit, the severe interferences can completely halt the waves inside the disordered medium.

For non-interacting electrons, a highly successful approach was put forward in 1979 by Abrahams et al. This scaling hypothesis of localization suggests that a disorder-induced metal-insulator transition (MIT) exists for non-interacting electrons in three dimensions (3D) at zero magnetic field and in the absence of spin-orbit coupling. Much further work has subsequently supported these scaling arguments both analytically and numerically (Brandes et al., 2003; see Further Reading). In 1D and 2D, the same hypothesis shows that there are no extended states and thus no MIT or only an apparent MIT. However, since 2 is the lower critical dimension of the localization problem, the 2D case is in a sense close to 3D: states are only marginally localized for weak disorder and a small spin-orbit coupling can lead to the existence of extended states and thus an MIT. Consequently, the localization lengths of a 2D system with potential-disorder can be quite large so that in numerical approaches one can always find a localization-delocalization transition when either decreasing system size for fixed disorder or increasing disorder for fixed system size.

Most numerical approaches to the localization problem use the standard tight-binding Anderson Hamiltonian with onsite-potential disorder. Characteristics of the electronic eigenstates are then investigated by studies of participation numbers obtained by exact diagonalization, multifractal properties, level statistics and many others. Especially fruitful is the transfer-matrix method (TMM) which allows a direct computation of the localization lengths and further validates the scaling hypothesis by a numerical proof of the existence of a one-parameter scaling function. Direct numerical solution of Maxwell equations to demonstrate Anderson localization of light has been implemented (Conti and Fratalocchi, 2008).

Recent work has proposed that a non-interacting Anderson localized system can become many-body localized even in the presence of weak interactions. The vanishing of conductivity has been rigorously proven for a particular 1D system, but rare Griffith's regions of lower average disorder (which always exist in the thermodynamic limit, become ergodic and can grow) are thought to destabilize localization in higher dimensions.

== Experimental evidence ==
Anderson localization can be observed in a perturbed periodic potential where the transverse localization of light is caused by random fluctuations on a photonic lattice. Experimental realizations of transverse localization were reported for a 2D lattice (Schwartz et al., 2007) and a 1D lattice (Lahini et al., 2006). Transverse Anderson localization of light has also been demonstrated in an optical fiber medium (Karbasi et al., 2012) and a biological medium (Choi et al., 2018), and has also been used to transport images through the fiber (Karbasi et al., 2014). It has also been observed by localization of a Bose–Einstein condensate in a 1D disordered optical potential (Billy et al., 2008; Roati et al., 2008).

In 3D, observations are more rare. Anderson localization of elastic waves in a 3D disordered medium has been reported (Hu et al., 2008). The observation of the MIT has been reported in a 3D model with atomic matter waves (Chabé et al., 2008). The MIT, associated with the nonpropagative electron waves has been reported in a cm-sized crystal (Ying et al., 2016). Random lasers can operate using this phenomenon.

The existence of Anderson localization for light in 3D was debated for years (Skipetrov et al., 2016) and remains unresolved today. Reports of Anderson localization of light in 3D random media were complicated by the competing/masking effects of absorption (Wiersma et al., 1997; Storzer et al., 2006; Scheffold et al., 1999; see Further Reading) and/or fluorescence (Sperling et al., 2016). Recent experiments (Naraghi et al., 2016; Cobus et al., 2023) support theoretical predictions that the vector nature of light prohibits the transition to Anderson localization (John, 1992; Skipetrov et al., 2019).

== Comparison with diffusion ==
Standard diffusion has no localization property, being in disagreement with quantum predictions. However, it turns out that it is based on approximation of the principle of maximum entropy, which says that the probability distribution which best represents the current state of knowledge is the one with largest entropy. This approximation is repaired in maximal entropy random walk, also repairing the disagreement: it turns out to lead to exactly the quantum ground state stationary probability distribution with its strong localization properties.

== See also ==
- Aubry–André model
