= Craig Huneke =

American mathematician

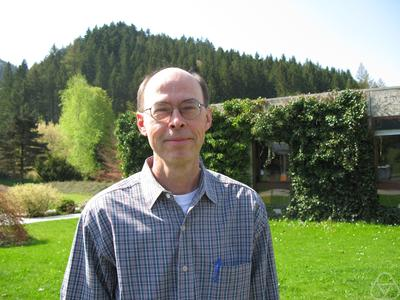
- Born: 27 August 1951 (age 75)
- Education: Oberlin College, and Yale University
- Scientific career
- Workplaces: Purdue University, and University of Virginia
- Doctoral advisor: Nathan Jacobson and David Eisenbud

Craig Lee Huneke (born August 27, 1951) is an American mathematician specializing in commutative algebra. He is a professor at the University of Virginia.

Huneke graduated from Oberlin College with a bachelor's degree in 1973 and in 1978 earned a Ph.D. from the Yale University under Nathan Jacobson and David Eisenbud (Determinantal ideal and questions related to factoriality). As a post-doctoral fellow, he was at the University of Michigan. In 1979 he became an assistant professor and was at the Massachusetts Institute of Technology and the University of Bonn (1980). In 1981 he became an assistant professor at Purdue University, where in 1984 he became an associate professor and became a professor in 1987. From 1994 to 1995 he was a visiting professor at the University of Michigan and in 1999 was at the Max Planck Institute for Mathematics in Bonn (as a Fulbright Scholar). In 1999, he was Henry J. Bischoff professor at the University of Kansas. In 2002 he was at MSRI. Since 2012 he has been Marvin Rosenblum professor at the University of Virginia.

With Melvin Hochster and others, he developed the theory of tight closure, a device in ring theory that is used to study rings containing a field of characteristic p in which Frobenius endomorphism figures prominently. He also studies linkage theory, Rees algebras, homological theory of modules over Noetherian rings, local cohomology, symbolic powers of ideals, Cohen-Macaulay rings, Gorenstein rings and Hilbert-Kunz functions.

He was an invited speaker at the International Congress of Mathematicians in 1990 in Kyoto (Absolute Integral Closure and Big Cohen-Macaulay Algebras). He is a fellow of the American Mathematical Society.

Huneke's son is historian Samuel Clowes Huneke.

== Writings ==
- With Hochster Tightly closed ideals, Bulletin of the American Mathematical Society, volume 18, 1988, pg. 45–48, MR 0919658
- With Hochster Tight closure, invariant theory, and the Briançon–Skoda theorem, Journal of the American Mathematical Society, volume 3, 1990, pg. 31–116
- With Hochster: Phantom Homology, Memoirs American Mathematical Society 1993
- Tight closure and its application, American Mathematical Society 1996
- With Irena Swanson: Integral closure of ideals, rings, and modules, Cambridge University Press, 2006
- With B. Ulrich The structure of linkage, Annals of Mathematics, volume 126, 1987, pg. 277–334
- With Hochster Infinite integral extensions and big Cohen-Macaulay algebras, Annals of Mathematics, volume 135, 1992, pg. 53–89
- With David Eisenbud, W. Vasconcelos Direct methods for primary decomposition, Inventiones Mathematicae, volume 110, 1992, pg. 207–236
- Uniform bounds in noetherian rings, Inventiones Mathematicae, volume 107, 1992, pg. 203–223
- With Hochster Comparison of symbolic and ordinary powers of ideals, Inventiones Mathematicae, volume 147, 2002, pg. 349–369
- With D. Eisenbud, B. Ulrich The regularity of Tor and graded Betti numbers, American Journal of Mathematics, volume 128, 2006, pg. 573-605
