= Irena Swanson =

American mathematician

Irena Swanson is an American mathematician specializing in commutative algebra. She is head of the Purdue University Department of Mathematics since 2020. She was a professor of mathematics at Reed College from 2005 to 2020.

== Education and career ==
Swanson is originally from the former Yugoslavia, in what is now Slovenia, and was attracted to mathematics from a very young age. She came to the US as an exchange student in Tooele, Utah in her last year of high school. There, she became interested in Reed College, the alma mater of her host family's daughter, and applied only to Reed for her undergraduate studies. She is a 1987 graduate of Reed, with an undergraduate thesis on functional analysis.

She went to Purdue University for graduate study, completing her Ph.D. in mathematics in 1992. Her dissertation, Tight Closure, Joint Reductions, And Mixed Multiplicities, was supervised by Craig Huneke. She became assistant professor at the University of Michigan in 1992 and joined the faculty at New Mexico State University in 1995, becoming full professor in 2005. In the same year she moved back to Reed.

Swanson returned to Purdue in 2020 as Head of the Department of Mathematics. She is the first woman to hold the position.

== Contributions ==
With her advisor, Craig Huneke, Swanson is the author of the book Integral Closure of Ideals, Rings, and Modules (Cambridge University Press, 2006). She is currently an Associate Editor for the Journal of Commutative Algebra.

Swanson is also a creator of mathematical quilts, and is the inventor of a quilting technique, "tube piecing", for making quilts more efficiently.

== Recognition ==
Swanson was included in the 2019 class of fellows of the American Mathematical Society "for contributions to commutative algebra, exposition, service to the profession and mentoring".
