= Homological conjectures in commutative algebra =

List of conjectures

In mathematics, homological conjectures have been a focus of research activity in commutative algebra since the early 1960s. They concern a number of interrelated (sometimes surprisingly so) conjectures relating various homological properties of a commutative ring to its internal ring structure, particularly its Krull dimension and depth.

The following list given by Melvin Hochster is considered definitive for this area. In the sequel, $A, R$, and $S$ refer to Noetherian commutative rings; $R$ will be a local ring with maximal ideal $m_R$, and $M$ and $N$ are finitely generated $R$-modules.

1. The Zero Divisor Theorem. If $M \ne 0$ has finite projective dimension and $r \in R$ is not a zero divisor on $M$, then $r$ is not a zero divisor on $R$.
2. Bass's Question. If $M \ne 0$ has a finite injective resolution, then $R$ is a Cohen–Macaulay ring.
3. The Intersection Theorem. If $M \otimes_R N \ne 0$ has finite length, then the Krull dimension of N (i.e., the dimension of R modulo the annihilator of N) is at most the projective dimension of M.
4. The New Intersection Theorem. Let $0 \to G_n\to\cdots \to G_0\to 0$ denote a finite complex of free R-modules such that $\bigoplus\nolimits_i H_i(G_{\bullet})$ has finite length but is not 0. Then the (Krull dimension) $\dim R \le n$.
5. The Improved New Intersection Conjecture. Let $0 \to G_n\to\cdots \to G_0\to 0$ denote a finite complex of free R-modules such that $H_i(G_{\bullet})$ has finite length for $i > 0$ and $H_0(G_{\bullet})$ has a minimal generator that is killed by a power of the maximal ideal of R. Then $\dim R \le n$.
6. The Direct Summand Conjecture. If $R \subseteq S$ is a module-finite ring extension with R regular (here, R need not be local but the problem reduces at once to the local case), then R is a direct summand of S as an R-module. The conjecture was proven by Yves André using a theory of perfectoid spaces.
7. The Canonical Element Conjecture. Let $x_1, \ldots, x_d$ be a system of parameters for R, let $F_\bullet$ be a free R-resolution of the residue field of R with $F_0 = R$, and let $K_\bullet$ denote the Koszul complex of R with respect to $x_1, \ldots, x_d$. Lift the identity map $R = K_0 \to F_0 = R$ to a map of complexes. Then no matter what the choice of system of parameters or lifting, the last map from $R = K_d \to F_d$ is not 0.
8. Existence of Balanced Big Cohen–Macaulay Modules Conjecture. There exists a (not necessarily finitely generated) R-module W such that m_{R}W ≠ W and every system of parameters for R is a regular sequence on W.
9. Cohen-Macaulayness of Direct Summands Conjecture. If R is a direct summand of a regular ring S as an R-module, then R is Cohen–Macaulay (R need not be local, but the result reduces at once to the case where R is local).
10. The Vanishing Conjecture for Maps of Tor. Let $A \subseteq R \to S$ be homomorphisms where R is not necessarily local (one can reduce to that case however), with A, S regular and R finitely generated as an A-module. Let W be any A-module. Then the map $\operatorname{Tor}_i^A(W,R) \to \operatorname{Tor}_i^A(W,S)$ is zero for all $i \ge 1$.
11. The Strong Direct Summand Conjecture. Let $R \subseteq S$ be a map of complete local domains, and let Q be a height one prime ideal of S lying over $xR$, where R and $R/xR$ are both regular. Then $xR$ is a direct summand of Q considered as R-modules.
12. Existence of Weakly Functorial Big Cohen-Macaulay Algebras Conjecture. Let $R \to S$ be a local homomorphism of complete local domains. Then there exists an R-algebra B_{R} that is a balanced big Cohen–Macaulay algebra for R, an S-algebra $B_S$ that is a balanced big Cohen-Macaulay algebra for S, and a homomorphism B_{R} → B_{S} such that the natural square given by these maps commutes.
13. Serre's Conjecture on Multiplicities. (cf. Serre's multiplicity conjectures.) Suppose that R is regular of dimension d and that $M \otimes_R N$ has finite length. Then $\chi(M, N)$, defined as the alternating sum of the lengths of the modules $\operatorname{Tor}_i^R(M, N)$ is 0 if $\dim M + \dim N < d$, and is positive if the sum is equal to d. (N.B. Jean-Pierre Serre proved that the sum cannot exceed d.)
14. Small Cohen–Macaulay Modules Conjecture. If R is complete, then there exists a finitely-generated R-module $M \ne 0$ such that some (equivalently every) system of parameters for R is a regular sequence on M.
