= Tight closure =

In mathematics, in the area of commutative algebra, tight closure is an operation defined on ideals in positive characteristic. It was introduced by Melvin Hochster and Craig Huneke (1988, 1990).

Let $R$ be a commutative noetherian ring containing a field of characteristic $p > 0$. Hence $p$ is a prime number.

Let $I$ be an ideal of $R$. The tight closure of $I$, denoted by $I^*$, is another ideal of $R$ containing $I$. The ideal $I^*$ is defined as follows.

$z \in I^*$ if and only if there exists a $c \in R$, where $c$ is not contained in any minimal prime ideal of $R$, such that $c z^{p^e} \in I^{[p^e]}$ for all $e \gg 0$. If $R$ is reduced, then one can instead consider all $e > 0$.

Here $I^{[p^e]}$ is used to denote the ideal of $R$ generated by the $p^e$'th powers of elements of $I$, called the $e$th Frobenius power of $I$.

An ideal is called tightly closed if $I = I^*$. A ring in which all ideals are tightly closed is called weakly $F$-regular (for Frobenius regular). A previous major open question in tight closure is whether the operation of tight closure commutes with localization, and so there is the additional notion of $F$-regular, which says that all ideals of the ring are still tightly closed in localizations of the ring.

Brenner & Monsky (2010) found a counterexample to the localization property of tight closure. However, there is still an open question of whether every weakly $F$-regular ring is $F$-regular. That is, if every ideal in a ring is tightly closed, is it true that every ideal in every localization of that ring is also tightly closed?
